

510001–510100 

|-bgcolor=#fefefe
| 510001 ||  || — || October 14, 2009 || Mount Lemmon || Mount Lemmon Survey ||  || align=right | 1.9 km || 
|-id=002 bgcolor=#fefefe
| 510002 ||  || — || November 8, 2009 || Catalina || CSS ||  || align=right | 1.0 km || 
|-id=003 bgcolor=#fefefe
| 510003 ||  || — || November 9, 2009 || Catalina || CSS || H || align=right data-sort-value="0.69" | 690 m || 
|-id=004 bgcolor=#fefefe
| 510004 ||  || — || October 26, 2009 || Kitt Peak || Spacewatch ||  || align=right data-sort-value="0.81" | 810 m || 
|-id=005 bgcolor=#fefefe
| 510005 ||  || — || October 14, 2009 || Mount Lemmon || Mount Lemmon Survey ||  || align=right data-sort-value="0.94" | 940 m || 
|-id=006 bgcolor=#fefefe
| 510006 ||  || — || November 21, 2009 || Catalina || CSS || H || align=right data-sort-value="0.62" | 620 m || 
|-id=007 bgcolor=#fefefe
| 510007 ||  || — || October 27, 2009 || Kitt Peak || Spacewatch || NYS || align=right data-sort-value="0.62" | 620 m || 
|-id=008 bgcolor=#fefefe
| 510008 ||  || — || September 29, 2009 || Mount Lemmon || Mount Lemmon Survey || V || align=right data-sort-value="0.55" | 550 m || 
|-id=009 bgcolor=#fefefe
| 510009 ||  || — || November 17, 2009 || Kitt Peak || Spacewatch ||  || align=right data-sort-value="0.65" | 650 m || 
|-id=010 bgcolor=#fefefe
| 510010 ||  || — || November 18, 2009 || Kitt Peak || Spacewatch || MAS || align=right data-sort-value="0.68" | 680 m || 
|-id=011 bgcolor=#fefefe
| 510011 ||  || — || November 8, 2009 || Catalina || CSS || H || align=right data-sort-value="0.63" | 630 m || 
|-id=012 bgcolor=#E9E9E9
| 510012 ||  || — || November 25, 2009 || Kitt Peak || Spacewatch || MAR || align=right data-sort-value="0.91" | 910 m || 
|-id=013 bgcolor=#FA8072
| 510013 ||  || — || December 17, 2009 || Mount Lemmon || Mount Lemmon Survey ||  || align=right data-sort-value="0.98" | 980 m || 
|-id=014 bgcolor=#d6d6d6
| 510014 ||  || — || December 16, 2009 || Kitt Peak || Spacewatch || 3:2 || align=right | 4.2 km || 
|-id=015 bgcolor=#fefefe
| 510015 ||  || — || December 18, 2009 || Mount Lemmon || Mount Lemmon Survey ||  || align=right | 2.3 km || 
|-id=016 bgcolor=#fefefe
| 510016 ||  || — || December 18, 2009 || Mount Lemmon || Mount Lemmon Survey || H || align=right data-sort-value="0.62" | 620 m || 
|-id=017 bgcolor=#E9E9E9
| 510017 ||  || — || December 27, 2009 || Kitt Peak || Spacewatch ||  || align=right data-sort-value="0.75" | 750 m || 
|-id=018 bgcolor=#fefefe
| 510018 ||  || — || January 9, 2010 || Mount Lemmon || Mount Lemmon Survey || H || align=right data-sort-value="0.74" | 740 m || 
|-id=019 bgcolor=#fefefe
| 510019 ||  || — || January 5, 2010 || Kitt Peak || Spacewatch || H || align=right data-sort-value="0.55" | 550 m || 
|-id=020 bgcolor=#E9E9E9
| 510020 ||  || — || December 19, 2009 || Mount Lemmon || Mount Lemmon Survey ||  || align=right | 1.5 km || 
|-id=021 bgcolor=#E9E9E9
| 510021 ||  || — || January 8, 2010 || Kitt Peak || Spacewatch ||  || align=right | 1.3 km || 
|-id=022 bgcolor=#E9E9E9
| 510022 ||  || — || January 12, 2010 || Catalina || CSS ||  || align=right | 1.7 km || 
|-id=023 bgcolor=#E9E9E9
| 510023 ||  || — || January 14, 2010 || WISE || WISE ||  || align=right | 2.7 km || 
|-id=024 bgcolor=#E9E9E9
| 510024 ||  || — || January 21, 2010 || WISE || WISE ||  || align=right | 2.0 km || 
|-id=025 bgcolor=#d6d6d6
| 510025 ||  || — || January 27, 2010 || WISE || WISE || Tj (2.98) || align=right | 4.5 km || 
|-id=026 bgcolor=#E9E9E9
| 510026 ||  || — || February 1, 2010 || WISE || WISE ||  || align=right | 2.1 km || 
|-id=027 bgcolor=#fefefe
| 510027 ||  || — || February 6, 2010 || Mount Lemmon || Mount Lemmon Survey || H || align=right data-sort-value="0.73" | 730 m || 
|-id=028 bgcolor=#E9E9E9
| 510028 ||  || — || February 11, 2010 || WISE || WISE ||  || align=right | 2.3 km || 
|-id=029 bgcolor=#E9E9E9
| 510029 ||  || — || February 9, 2010 || Kitt Peak || Spacewatch ||  || align=right | 1.6 km || 
|-id=030 bgcolor=#E9E9E9
| 510030 ||  || — || January 12, 2010 || Kitt Peak || Spacewatch ||  || align=right data-sort-value="0.83" | 830 m || 
|-id=031 bgcolor=#fefefe
| 510031 ||  || — || February 5, 2010 || Catalina || CSS || H || align=right data-sort-value="0.99" | 990 m || 
|-id=032 bgcolor=#E9E9E9
| 510032 ||  || — || February 14, 2010 || Kitt Peak || Spacewatch ||  || align=right | 1.2 km || 
|-id=033 bgcolor=#fefefe
| 510033 ||  || — || February 14, 2010 || Kitt Peak || Spacewatch || H || align=right data-sort-value="0.72" | 720 m || 
|-id=034 bgcolor=#E9E9E9
| 510034 ||  || — || February 14, 2010 || Kitt Peak || Spacewatch ||  || align=right data-sort-value="0.73" | 730 m || 
|-id=035 bgcolor=#E9E9E9
| 510035 ||  || — || February 6, 2010 || Kitt Peak || Spacewatch || BRG || align=right | 1.3 km || 
|-id=036 bgcolor=#E9E9E9
| 510036 ||  || — || February 14, 2010 || Haleakala || Pan-STARRS ||  || align=right | 1.9 km || 
|-id=037 bgcolor=#E9E9E9
| 510037 ||  || — || February 15, 2010 || Haleakala || Pan-STARRS ||  || align=right data-sort-value="0.83" | 830 m || 
|-id=038 bgcolor=#E9E9E9
| 510038 ||  || — || February 13, 2010 || Mount Lemmon || Mount Lemmon Survey ||  || align=right data-sort-value="0.83" | 830 m || 
|-id=039 bgcolor=#fefefe
| 510039 ||  || — || February 6, 2010 || Socorro || LINEAR || H || align=right data-sort-value="0.78" | 780 m || 
|-id=040 bgcolor=#d6d6d6
| 510040 ||  || — || February 4, 2010 || WISE || WISE ||  || align=right | 4.6 km || 
|-id=041 bgcolor=#E9E9E9
| 510041 ||  || — || January 13, 2005 || Socorro || LINEAR ||  || align=right | 2.5 km || 
|-id=042 bgcolor=#E9E9E9
| 510042 ||  || — || February 26, 2010 || WISE || WISE ||  || align=right | 1.4 km || 
|-id=043 bgcolor=#E9E9E9
| 510043 ||  || — || February 16, 2010 || Haleakala || Pan-STARRS ||  || align=right | 1.5 km || 
|-id=044 bgcolor=#E9E9E9
| 510044 ||  || — || February 19, 2010 || Mount Lemmon || Mount Lemmon Survey ||  || align=right | 1.6 km || 
|-id=045 bgcolor=#E9E9E9
| 510045 Vincematteo ||  ||  || March 4, 2010 || Vail-Jarnac || D. H. Levy, T. Glinos ||  || align=right | 1.6 km || 
|-id=046 bgcolor=#fefefe
| 510046 ||  || — || March 4, 2010 || Kitt Peak || Spacewatch || H || align=right data-sort-value="0.57" | 570 m || 
|-id=047 bgcolor=#E9E9E9
| 510047 ||  || — || March 10, 2010 || La Sagra || OAM Obs. || EUN || align=right | 1.6 km || 
|-id=048 bgcolor=#E9E9E9
| 510048 ||  || — || February 19, 2010 || Mount Lemmon || Mount Lemmon Survey || HNS || align=right data-sort-value="0.84" | 840 m || 
|-id=049 bgcolor=#E9E9E9
| 510049 ||  || — || March 12, 2010 || Catalina || CSS ||  || align=right | 2.4 km || 
|-id=050 bgcolor=#E9E9E9
| 510050 ||  || — || March 12, 2010 || Kitt Peak || Spacewatch ||  || align=right | 1.3 km || 
|-id=051 bgcolor=#E9E9E9
| 510051 ||  || — || February 18, 2010 || Mount Lemmon || Mount Lemmon Survey ||  || align=right | 1.4 km || 
|-id=052 bgcolor=#E9E9E9
| 510052 ||  || — || March 13, 2010 || Mount Lemmon || Mount Lemmon Survey ||  || align=right | 1.6 km || 
|-id=053 bgcolor=#E9E9E9
| 510053 ||  || — || March 20, 2010 || Siding Spring || SSS ||  || align=right | 1.3 km || 
|-id=054 bgcolor=#d6d6d6
| 510054 ||  || — || September 28, 2006 || Catalina || CSS ||  || align=right | 5.0 km || 
|-id=055 bgcolor=#FFC2E0
| 510055 ||  || — || March 30, 2010 || WISE || WISE || APOPHA || align=right data-sort-value="0.2" | 200 m || 
|-id=056 bgcolor=#E9E9E9
| 510056 ||  || — || February 14, 2010 || Mount Lemmon || Mount Lemmon Survey ||  || align=right | 1.7 km || 
|-id=057 bgcolor=#E9E9E9
| 510057 ||  || — || March 17, 2010 || Kitt Peak || Spacewatch ||  || align=right | 1.3 km || 
|-id=058 bgcolor=#fefefe
| 510058 ||  || — || April 4, 2010 || XuYi || PMO NEO || H || align=right data-sort-value="0.82" | 820 m || 
|-id=059 bgcolor=#E9E9E9
| 510059 ||  || — || April 6, 2010 || Kitt Peak || Spacewatch ||  || align=right | 1.3 km || 
|-id=060 bgcolor=#E9E9E9
| 510060 ||  || — || April 6, 2010 || Kitt Peak || Spacewatch ||  || align=right | 1.2 km || 
|-id=061 bgcolor=#E9E9E9
| 510061 ||  || — || April 6, 2010 || Catalina || CSS ||  || align=right | 3.4 km || 
|-id=062 bgcolor=#E9E9E9
| 510062 ||  || — || January 16, 2010 || WISE || WISE ||  || align=right | 1.6 km || 
|-id=063 bgcolor=#C2FFFF
| 510063 ||  || — || August 23, 2011 || Haleakala || Pan-STARRS || L5 || align=right | 7.2 km || 
|-id=064 bgcolor=#d6d6d6
| 510064 ||  || — || April 23, 2010 || WISE || WISE ||  || align=right | 2.7 km || 
|-id=065 bgcolor=#fefefe
| 510065 ||  || — || April 24, 2010 || WISE || WISE ||  || align=right | 1.5 km || 
|-id=066 bgcolor=#d6d6d6
| 510066 ||  || — || April 28, 2010 || WISE || WISE ||  || align=right | 3.2 km || 
|-id=067 bgcolor=#E9E9E9
| 510067 ||  || — || April 25, 2010 || Mount Lemmon || Mount Lemmon Survey ||  || align=right | 1.8 km || 
|-id=068 bgcolor=#E9E9E9
| 510068 ||  || — || April 20, 2010 || Mount Lemmon || Mount Lemmon Survey ||  || align=right | 1.7 km || 
|-id=069 bgcolor=#E9E9E9
| 510069 ||  || — || April 9, 2010 || Kitt Peak || Spacewatch || ADE || align=right | 1.9 km || 
|-id=070 bgcolor=#E9E9E9
| 510070 ||  || — || May 6, 2010 || Kitt Peak || Spacewatch ||  || align=right | 2.2 km || 
|-id=071 bgcolor=#E9E9E9
| 510071 ||  || — || April 14, 2010 || Mount Lemmon || Mount Lemmon Survey ||  || align=right | 1.8 km || 
|-id=072 bgcolor=#E9E9E9
| 510072 ||  || — || May 6, 2010 || Catalina || CSS ||  || align=right | 2.9 km || 
|-id=073 bgcolor=#FFC2E0
| 510073 ||  || — || May 14, 2010 || Catalina || CSS || APO || align=right data-sort-value="0.45" | 450 m || 
|-id=074 bgcolor=#E9E9E9
| 510074 ||  || — || February 7, 2010 || WISE || WISE ||  || align=right | 1.4 km || 
|-id=075 bgcolor=#d6d6d6
| 510075 ||  || — || November 25, 2006 || Kitt Peak || Spacewatch ||  || align=right | 6.5 km || 
|-id=076 bgcolor=#E9E9E9
| 510076 ||  || — || May 13, 2010 || Catalina || CSS ||  || align=right | 1.4 km || 
|-id=077 bgcolor=#E9E9E9
| 510077 ||  || — || December 31, 2008 || Kitt Peak || Spacewatch ||  || align=right | 1.6 km || 
|-id=078 bgcolor=#C2FFFF
| 510078 ||  || — || November 19, 2003 || Kitt Peak || Spacewatch || L5 || align=right | 10 km || 
|-id=079 bgcolor=#E9E9E9
| 510079 ||  || — || April 6, 2010 || Kitt Peak || Spacewatch ||  || align=right | 1.7 km || 
|-id=080 bgcolor=#E9E9E9
| 510080 ||  || — || April 11, 2010 || Kitt Peak || Spacewatch ||  || align=right | 1.3 km || 
|-id=081 bgcolor=#d6d6d6
| 510081 ||  || — || May 28, 2010 || WISE || WISE ||  || align=right | 3.6 km || 
|-id=082 bgcolor=#d6d6d6
| 510082 ||  || — || May 28, 2010 || WISE || WISE ||  || align=right | 3.8 km || 
|-id=083 bgcolor=#d6d6d6
| 510083 ||  || — || May 30, 2010 || WISE || WISE ||  || align=right | 3.3 km || 
|-id=084 bgcolor=#d6d6d6
| 510084 ||  || — || May 30, 2010 || WISE || WISE ||  || align=right | 3.9 km || 
|-id=085 bgcolor=#E9E9E9
| 510085 ||  || — || May 19, 2010 || Mount Lemmon || Mount Lemmon Survey ||  || align=right | 1.7 km || 
|-id=086 bgcolor=#d6d6d6
| 510086 ||  || — || February 19, 2010 || Kitt Peak || Spacewatch ||  || align=right | 3.4 km || 
|-id=087 bgcolor=#d6d6d6
| 510087 ||  || — || November 26, 2006 || Kitt Peak || Spacewatch ||  || align=right | 3.8 km || 
|-id=088 bgcolor=#d6d6d6
| 510088 ||  || — || February 21, 2007 || Mount Lemmon || Mount Lemmon Survey ||  || align=right | 4.3 km || 
|-id=089 bgcolor=#d6d6d6
| 510089 ||  || — || June 21, 2010 || WISE || WISE ||  || align=right | 3.4 km || 
|-id=090 bgcolor=#d6d6d6
| 510090 ||  || — || June 28, 2010 || WISE || WISE ||  || align=right | 2.8 km || 
|-id=091 bgcolor=#d6d6d6
| 510091 ||  || — || October 25, 2005 || Kitt Peak || Spacewatch ||  || align=right | 3.2 km || 
|-id=092 bgcolor=#E9E9E9
| 510092 ||  || — || January 19, 2010 || WISE || WISE ||  || align=right | 2.3 km || 
|-id=093 bgcolor=#d6d6d6
| 510093 ||  || — || July 17, 2010 || WISE || WISE ||  || align=right | 4.3 km || 
|-id=094 bgcolor=#d6d6d6
| 510094 ||  || — || July 21, 2010 || WISE || WISE ||  || align=right | 3.0 km || 
|-id=095 bgcolor=#d6d6d6
| 510095 ||  || — || July 23, 2010 || WISE || WISE ||  || align=right | 3.8 km || 
|-id=096 bgcolor=#d6d6d6
| 510096 ||  || — || January 29, 2010 || WISE || WISE ||  || align=right | 3.0 km || 
|-id=097 bgcolor=#d6d6d6
| 510097 ||  || — || July 23, 2010 || WISE || WISE || Tj (2.87) || align=right | 5.7 km || 
|-id=098 bgcolor=#d6d6d6
| 510098 ||  || — || July 27, 2009 || Kitt Peak || Spacewatch ||  || align=right | 3.1 km || 
|-id=099 bgcolor=#fefefe
| 510099 ||  || — || August 10, 2010 || Kitt Peak || Spacewatch ||  || align=right data-sort-value="0.53" | 530 m || 
|-id=100 bgcolor=#d6d6d6
| 510100 ||  || — || August 10, 2010 || WISE || WISE || Tj (2.97) || align=right | 6.0 km || 
|}

510101–510200 

|-bgcolor=#d6d6d6
| 510101 ||  || — || June 13, 2010 || WISE || WISE ||  || align=right | 3.1 km || 
|-id=102 bgcolor=#d6d6d6
| 510102 ||  || — || September 2, 2010 || Mount Lemmon || Mount Lemmon Survey ||  || align=right | 2.4 km || 
|-id=103 bgcolor=#fefefe
| 510103 ||  || — || October 1, 2000 || Socorro || LINEAR ||  || align=right data-sort-value="0.61" | 610 m || 
|-id=104 bgcolor=#d6d6d6
| 510104 ||  || — || September 4, 2010 || Kitt Peak || Spacewatch ||  || align=right | 3.1 km || 
|-id=105 bgcolor=#fefefe
| 510105 ||  || — || September 6, 2010 || Kitt Peak || Spacewatch ||  || align=right data-sort-value="0.63" | 630 m || 
|-id=106 bgcolor=#fefefe
| 510106 ||  || — || September 7, 2010 || La Sagra || OAM Obs. ||  || align=right data-sort-value="0.64" | 640 m || 
|-id=107 bgcolor=#fefefe
| 510107 ||  || — || December 15, 2007 || Kitt Peak || Spacewatch ||  || align=right data-sort-value="0.67" | 670 m || 
|-id=108 bgcolor=#d6d6d6
| 510108 ||  || — || September 10, 2010 || Kitt Peak || Spacewatch ||  || align=right | 3.1 km || 
|-id=109 bgcolor=#fefefe
| 510109 ||  || — || September 10, 2010 || Kitt Peak || Spacewatch ||  || align=right data-sort-value="0.53" | 530 m || 
|-id=110 bgcolor=#fefefe
| 510110 ||  || — || September 10, 2010 || Kitt Peak || Spacewatch ||  || align=right data-sort-value="0.63" | 630 m || 
|-id=111 bgcolor=#d6d6d6
| 510111 ||  || — || November 25, 2005 || Mount Lemmon || Mount Lemmon Survey || THM || align=right | 1.9 km || 
|-id=112 bgcolor=#d6d6d6
| 510112 ||  || — || September 15, 2010 || Kitt Peak || Spacewatch || EOS || align=right | 1.9 km || 
|-id=113 bgcolor=#d6d6d6
| 510113 ||  || — || September 15, 2010 || Mount Lemmon || Mount Lemmon Survey ||  || align=right | 3.2 km || 
|-id=114 bgcolor=#d6d6d6
| 510114 ||  || — || September 17, 2010 || Mount Lemmon || Mount Lemmon Survey ||  || align=right | 2.2 km || 
|-id=115 bgcolor=#d6d6d6
| 510115 ||  || — || September 30, 2010 || Mount Lemmon || Mount Lemmon Survey ||  || align=right | 2.5 km || 
|-id=116 bgcolor=#fefefe
| 510116 ||  || — || September 11, 2010 || Catalina || CSS ||  || align=right data-sort-value="0.74" | 740 m || 
|-id=117 bgcolor=#d6d6d6
| 510117 ||  || — || December 15, 2006 || Kitt Peak || Spacewatch ||  || align=right | 2.9 km || 
|-id=118 bgcolor=#d6d6d6
| 510118 ||  || — || October 1, 2010 || Kitt Peak || Spacewatch ||  || align=right | 2.2 km || 
|-id=119 bgcolor=#d6d6d6
| 510119 ||  || — || October 2, 2010 || Kitt Peak || Spacewatch ||  || align=right | 2.1 km || 
|-id=120 bgcolor=#d6d6d6
| 510120 ||  || — || September 30, 2010 || Mount Lemmon || Mount Lemmon Survey ||  || align=right | 3.6 km || 
|-id=121 bgcolor=#fefefe
| 510121 ||  || — || September 17, 2010 || Kitt Peak || Spacewatch ||  || align=right data-sort-value="0.66" | 660 m || 
|-id=122 bgcolor=#fefefe
| 510122 ||  || — || November 19, 2007 || Kitt Peak || Spacewatch ||  || align=right data-sort-value="0.51" | 510 m || 
|-id=123 bgcolor=#fefefe
| 510123 ||  || — || September 4, 2010 || Kitt Peak || Spacewatch ||  || align=right data-sort-value="0.52" | 520 m || 
|-id=124 bgcolor=#d6d6d6
| 510124 ||  || — || September 16, 2010 || Kitt Peak || Spacewatch ||  || align=right | 3.0 km || 
|-id=125 bgcolor=#fefefe
| 510125 ||  || — || October 1, 2010 || Kitt Peak || Spacewatch ||  || align=right data-sort-value="0.48" | 480 m || 
|-id=126 bgcolor=#fefefe
| 510126 ||  || — || October 11, 2010 || Mount Lemmon || Mount Lemmon Survey ||  || align=right data-sort-value="0.73" | 730 m || 
|-id=127 bgcolor=#d6d6d6
| 510127 ||  || — || October 1, 2010 || La Sagra || OAM Obs. ||  || align=right | 3.6 km || 
|-id=128 bgcolor=#fefefe
| 510128 ||  || — || October 1, 2010 || La Sagra || OAM Obs. ||  || align=right data-sort-value="0.68" | 680 m || 
|-id=129 bgcolor=#d6d6d6
| 510129 ||  || — || October 17, 2010 || Mount Lemmon || Mount Lemmon Survey ||  || align=right | 2.9 km || 
|-id=130 bgcolor=#fefefe
| 510130 ||  || — || September 18, 2010 || Mount Lemmon || Mount Lemmon Survey ||  || align=right data-sort-value="0.64" | 640 m || 
|-id=131 bgcolor=#fefefe
| 510131 ||  || — || October 13, 2010 || Mount Lemmon || Mount Lemmon Survey ||  || align=right data-sort-value="0.59" | 590 m || 
|-id=132 bgcolor=#fefefe
| 510132 ||  || — || October 8, 1996 || Kitt Peak || Spacewatch ||  || align=right data-sort-value="0.62" | 620 m || 
|-id=133 bgcolor=#fefefe
| 510133 ||  || — || October 21, 2003 || Kitt Peak || Spacewatch ||  || align=right data-sort-value="0.62" | 620 m || 
|-id=134 bgcolor=#fefefe
| 510134 ||  || — || September 10, 2010 || Mount Lemmon || Mount Lemmon Survey ||  || align=right data-sort-value="0.68" | 680 m || 
|-id=135 bgcolor=#d6d6d6
| 510135 ||  || — || October 28, 2010 || Catalina || CSS ||  || align=right | 4.2 km || 
|-id=136 bgcolor=#fefefe
| 510136 ||  || — || August 12, 2010 || Kitt Peak || Spacewatch ||  || align=right data-sort-value="0.88" | 880 m || 
|-id=137 bgcolor=#FA8072
| 510137 ||  || — || December 31, 2007 || Kitt Peak || Spacewatch ||  || align=right data-sort-value="0.60" | 600 m || 
|-id=138 bgcolor=#fefefe
| 510138 ||  || — || October 30, 2010 || Mount Lemmon || Mount Lemmon Survey ||  || align=right data-sort-value="0.64" | 640 m || 
|-id=139 bgcolor=#d6d6d6
| 510139 ||  || — || October 2, 2010 || Kitt Peak || Spacewatch ||  || align=right | 2.8 km || 
|-id=140 bgcolor=#C2FFFF
| 510140 ||  || — || October 30, 2010 || Kitt Peak || Spacewatch || L4 || align=right | 7.7 km || 
|-id=141 bgcolor=#fefefe
| 510141 ||  || — || January 15, 2008 || Mount Lemmon || Mount Lemmon Survey ||  || align=right data-sort-value="0.65" | 650 m || 
|-id=142 bgcolor=#d6d6d6
| 510142 ||  || — || October 13, 2010 || Mount Lemmon || Mount Lemmon Survey ||  || align=right | 4.0 km || 
|-id=143 bgcolor=#d6d6d6
| 510143 ||  || — || October 13, 2010 || Mount Lemmon || Mount Lemmon Survey ||  || align=right | 2.3 km || 
|-id=144 bgcolor=#fefefe
| 510144 ||  || — || September 11, 2010 || Mount Lemmon || Mount Lemmon Survey ||  || align=right data-sort-value="0.59" | 590 m || 
|-id=145 bgcolor=#fefefe
| 510145 ||  || — || November 19, 2003 || Kitt Peak || Spacewatch ||  || align=right data-sort-value="0.57" | 570 m || 
|-id=146 bgcolor=#fefefe
| 510146 ||  || — || January 13, 2008 || Mount Lemmon || Mount Lemmon Survey ||  || align=right data-sort-value="0.47" | 470 m || 
|-id=147 bgcolor=#fefefe
| 510147 ||  || — || November 6, 2010 || Mount Lemmon || Mount Lemmon Survey ||  || align=right data-sort-value="0.62" | 620 m || 
|-id=148 bgcolor=#fefefe
| 510148 ||  || — || February 2, 2005 || Kitt Peak || Spacewatch ||  || align=right data-sort-value="0.50" | 500 m || 
|-id=149 bgcolor=#fefefe
| 510149 ||  || — || January 14, 2008 || Kitt Peak || Spacewatch ||  || align=right data-sort-value="0.53" | 530 m || 
|-id=150 bgcolor=#fefefe
| 510150 ||  || — || October 14, 2010 || Mount Lemmon || Mount Lemmon Survey ||  || align=right data-sort-value="0.58" | 580 m || 
|-id=151 bgcolor=#d6d6d6
| 510151 ||  || — || February 9, 2007 || Kitt Peak || Spacewatch ||  || align=right | 3.2 km || 
|-id=152 bgcolor=#fefefe
| 510152 ||  || — || October 30, 2010 || Kitt Peak || Spacewatch ||  || align=right data-sort-value="0.66" | 660 m || 
|-id=153 bgcolor=#fefefe
| 510153 ||  || — || October 20, 2003 || Kitt Peak || Spacewatch ||  || align=right data-sort-value="0.66" | 660 m || 
|-id=154 bgcolor=#fefefe
| 510154 ||  || — || November 8, 2010 || Kitt Peak || Spacewatch ||  || align=right data-sort-value="0.65" | 650 m || 
|-id=155 bgcolor=#fefefe
| 510155 ||  || — || November 10, 2010 || Mount Lemmon || Mount Lemmon Survey ||  || align=right data-sort-value="0.70" | 700 m || 
|-id=156 bgcolor=#FA8072
| 510156 ||  || — || November 24, 2003 || Kitt Peak || Spacewatch ||  || align=right | 1.2 km || 
|-id=157 bgcolor=#fefefe
| 510157 ||  || — || November 16, 2003 || Kitt Peak || Spacewatch ||  || align=right data-sort-value="0.54" | 540 m || 
|-id=158 bgcolor=#fefefe
| 510158 ||  || — || January 11, 2008 || Kitt Peak || Spacewatch ||  || align=right data-sort-value="0.50" | 500 m || 
|-id=159 bgcolor=#d6d6d6
| 510159 ||  || — || December 1, 2010 || Mount Lemmon || Mount Lemmon Survey || 7:4 || align=right | 3.7 km || 
|-id=160 bgcolor=#FFC2E0
| 510160 ||  || — || December 11, 2010 || Socorro || LINEAR || APOcritical || align=right data-sort-value="0.34" | 340 m || 
|-id=161 bgcolor=#fefefe
| 510161 ||  || — || February 28, 2008 || Mount Lemmon || Mount Lemmon Survey ||  || align=right data-sort-value="0.69" | 690 m || 
|-id=162 bgcolor=#fefefe
| 510162 ||  || — || November 14, 2010 || Mount Lemmon || Mount Lemmon Survey ||  || align=right data-sort-value="0.50" | 500 m || 
|-id=163 bgcolor=#d6d6d6
| 510163 ||  || — || August 15, 2009 || Catalina || CSS ||  || align=right | 4.0 km || 
|-id=164 bgcolor=#fefefe
| 510164 ||  || — || January 2, 2011 || Mount Lemmon || Mount Lemmon Survey ||  || align=right data-sort-value="0.71" | 710 m || 
|-id=165 bgcolor=#fefefe
| 510165 ||  || — || November 15, 2010 || Mount Lemmon || Mount Lemmon Survey ||  || align=right data-sort-value="0.62" | 620 m || 
|-id=166 bgcolor=#fefefe
| 510166 ||  || — || January 22, 2004 || Socorro || LINEAR ||  || align=right data-sort-value="0.73" | 730 m || 
|-id=167 bgcolor=#fefefe
| 510167 ||  || — || September 27, 2006 || Kitt Peak || Spacewatch ||  || align=right data-sort-value="0.65" | 650 m || 
|-id=168 bgcolor=#fefefe
| 510168 ||  || — || October 23, 2006 || Kitt Peak || Spacewatch ||  || align=right data-sort-value="0.64" | 640 m || 
|-id=169 bgcolor=#fefefe
| 510169 ||  || — || September 7, 2002 || Campo Imperatore || CINEOS ||  || align=right data-sort-value="0.69" | 690 m || 
|-id=170 bgcolor=#fefefe
| 510170 ||  || — || February 13, 2004 || Anderson Mesa || LONEOS ||  || align=right data-sort-value="0.72" | 720 m || 
|-id=171 bgcolor=#fefefe
| 510171 ||  || — || November 16, 2006 || Catalina || CSS ||  || align=right data-sort-value="0.75" | 750 m || 
|-id=172 bgcolor=#fefefe
| 510172 ||  || — || December 5, 2010 || Mount Lemmon || Mount Lemmon Survey ||  || align=right data-sort-value="0.60" | 600 m || 
|-id=173 bgcolor=#fefefe
| 510173 ||  || — || December 8, 2010 || Mount Lemmon || Mount Lemmon Survey ||  || align=right data-sort-value="0.61" | 610 m || 
|-id=174 bgcolor=#fefefe
| 510174 ||  || — || January 10, 2011 || Kitt Peak || Spacewatch ||  || align=right data-sort-value="0.65" | 650 m || 
|-id=175 bgcolor=#fefefe
| 510175 ||  || — || January 10, 2011 || Mount Lemmon || Mount Lemmon Survey ||  || align=right data-sort-value="0.58" | 580 m || 
|-id=176 bgcolor=#fefefe
| 510176 ||  || — || February 13, 1997 || Kitt Peak || Spacewatch ||  || align=right data-sort-value="0.52" | 520 m || 
|-id=177 bgcolor=#fefefe
| 510177 ||  || — || January 8, 2011 || Mount Lemmon || Mount Lemmon Survey ||  || align=right data-sort-value="0.69" | 690 m || 
|-id=178 bgcolor=#FA8072
| 510178 ||  || — || January 28, 2011 || Catalina || CSS ||  || align=right data-sort-value="0.90" | 900 m || 
|-id=179 bgcolor=#fefefe
| 510179 ||  || — || October 27, 2006 || Catalina || CSS ||  || align=right data-sort-value="0.71" | 710 m || 
|-id=180 bgcolor=#fefefe
| 510180 ||  || — || December 1, 2006 || Mount Lemmon || Mount Lemmon Survey ||  || align=right data-sort-value="0.62" | 620 m || 
|-id=181 bgcolor=#fefefe
| 510181 ||  || — || January 30, 2011 || Haleakala || Pan-STARRS ||  || align=right data-sort-value="0.78" | 780 m || 
|-id=182 bgcolor=#fefefe
| 510182 ||  || — || December 22, 2006 || Mount Lemmon || Mount Lemmon Survey || NYS || align=right data-sort-value="0.55" | 550 m || 
|-id=183 bgcolor=#d6d6d6
| 510183 ||  || — || March 23, 2004 || Kitt Peak || Spacewatch || 3:2 || align=right | 3.5 km || 
|-id=184 bgcolor=#fefefe
| 510184 ||  || — || September 27, 2006 || Mount Lemmon || Mount Lemmon Survey ||  || align=right data-sort-value="0.52" | 520 m || 
|-id=185 bgcolor=#fefefe
| 510185 ||  || — || January 11, 2011 || Kitt Peak || Spacewatch ||  || align=right data-sort-value="0.58" | 580 m || 
|-id=186 bgcolor=#fefefe
| 510186 ||  || — || January 26, 2011 || Mount Lemmon || Mount Lemmon Survey ||  || align=right data-sort-value="0.67" | 670 m || 
|-id=187 bgcolor=#fefefe
| 510187 ||  || — || March 16, 2004 || Kitt Peak || Spacewatch ||  || align=right data-sort-value="0.59" | 590 m || 
|-id=188 bgcolor=#fefefe
| 510188 ||  || — || March 15, 2004 || Kitt Peak || Spacewatch ||  || align=right data-sort-value="0.59" | 590 m || 
|-id=189 bgcolor=#FA8072
| 510189 ||  || — || February 5, 2011 || Catalina || CSS ||  || align=right data-sort-value="0.79" | 790 m || 
|-id=190 bgcolor=#FFC2E0
| 510190 ||  || — || February 5, 2011 || Mount Lemmon || Mount Lemmon Survey || APO || align=right data-sort-value="0.27" | 270 m || 
|-id=191 bgcolor=#fefefe
| 510191 ||  || — || December 10, 2010 || Mount Lemmon || Mount Lemmon Survey || MAS || align=right data-sort-value="0.56" | 560 m || 
|-id=192 bgcolor=#fefefe
| 510192 ||  || — || December 10, 2010 || Mount Lemmon || Mount Lemmon Survey ||  || align=right data-sort-value="0.74" | 740 m || 
|-id=193 bgcolor=#fefefe
| 510193 ||  || — || December 10, 2010 || Mount Lemmon || Mount Lemmon Survey ||  || align=right data-sort-value="0.65" | 650 m || 
|-id=194 bgcolor=#fefefe
| 510194 ||  || — || January 30, 2011 || Haleakala || Pan-STARRS ||  || align=right data-sort-value="0.53" | 530 m || 
|-id=195 bgcolor=#fefefe
| 510195 ||  || — || December 8, 2010 || Mount Lemmon || Mount Lemmon Survey ||  || align=right data-sort-value="0.58" | 580 m || 
|-id=196 bgcolor=#fefefe
| 510196 ||  || — || January 30, 2011 || Mount Lemmon || Mount Lemmon Survey ||  || align=right data-sort-value="0.60" | 600 m || 
|-id=197 bgcolor=#fefefe
| 510197 ||  || — || September 30, 2006 || Mount Lemmon || Mount Lemmon Survey ||  || align=right data-sort-value="0.65" | 650 m || 
|-id=198 bgcolor=#fefefe
| 510198 ||  || — || January 12, 2011 || Mount Lemmon || Mount Lemmon Survey ||  || align=right data-sort-value="0.67" | 670 m || 
|-id=199 bgcolor=#fefefe
| 510199 ||  || — || December 8, 2010 || Mount Lemmon || Mount Lemmon Survey ||  || align=right data-sort-value="0.64" | 640 m || 
|-id=200 bgcolor=#fefefe
| 510200 ||  || — || February 10, 2011 || Catalina || CSS ||  || align=right | 1.3 km || 
|}

510201–510300 

|-bgcolor=#E9E9E9
| 510201 ||  || — || February 10, 2011 || Catalina || CSS ||  || align=right | 2.4 km || 
|-id=202 bgcolor=#fefefe
| 510202 ||  || — || January 30, 2011 || Haleakala || Pan-STARRS ||  || align=right data-sort-value="0.75" | 750 m || 
|-id=203 bgcolor=#fefefe
| 510203 ||  || — || January 30, 2011 || Haleakala || Pan-STARRS || V || align=right data-sort-value="0.51" | 510 m || 
|-id=204 bgcolor=#fefefe
| 510204 ||  || — || January 27, 2011 || Kitt Peak || Spacewatch ||  || align=right data-sort-value="0.86" | 860 m || 
|-id=205 bgcolor=#E9E9E9
| 510205 ||  || — || January 30, 2011 || Haleakala || Pan-STARRS ||  || align=right data-sort-value="0.67" | 670 m || 
|-id=206 bgcolor=#fefefe
| 510206 ||  || — || January 27, 2011 || Kitt Peak || Spacewatch ||  || align=right data-sort-value="0.62" | 620 m || 
|-id=207 bgcolor=#fefefe
| 510207 ||  || — || February 4, 2011 || Haleakala || Pan-STARRS ||  || align=right data-sort-value="0.80" | 800 m || 
|-id=208 bgcolor=#fefefe
| 510208 ||  || — || November 16, 1995 || Kitt Peak || Spacewatch || V || align=right data-sort-value="0.45" | 450 m || 
|-id=209 bgcolor=#fefefe
| 510209 ||  || — || January 30, 2011 || Haleakala || Pan-STARRS ||  || align=right data-sort-value="0.57" | 570 m || 
|-id=210 bgcolor=#fefefe
| 510210 ||  || — || January 30, 2011 || Haleakala || Pan-STARRS || V || align=right data-sort-value="0.64" | 640 m || 
|-id=211 bgcolor=#fefefe
| 510211 ||  || — || January 28, 2011 || Mount Lemmon || Mount Lemmon Survey ||  || align=right data-sort-value="0.65" | 650 m || 
|-id=212 bgcolor=#fefefe
| 510212 ||  || — || November 16, 2006 || Kitt Peak || Spacewatch ||  || align=right data-sort-value="0.61" | 610 m || 
|-id=213 bgcolor=#fefefe
| 510213 ||  || — || February 25, 2011 || Mount Lemmon || Mount Lemmon Survey ||  || align=right data-sort-value="0.60" | 600 m || 
|-id=214 bgcolor=#fefefe
| 510214 ||  || — || January 29, 2011 || Kitt Peak || Spacewatch || NYS || align=right data-sort-value="0.61" | 610 m || 
|-id=215 bgcolor=#fefefe
| 510215 ||  || — || January 30, 2011 || Haleakala || Pan-STARRS ||  || align=right data-sort-value="0.68" | 680 m || 
|-id=216 bgcolor=#fefefe
| 510216 ||  || — || February 28, 2011 || La Sagra || OAM Obs. ||  || align=right data-sort-value="0.82" | 820 m || 
|-id=217 bgcolor=#fefefe
| 510217 ||  || — || February 10, 2011 || Mount Lemmon || Mount Lemmon Survey ||  || align=right data-sort-value="0.78" | 780 m || 
|-id=218 bgcolor=#fefefe
| 510218 ||  || — || February 8, 2011 || Mount Lemmon || Mount Lemmon Survey ||  || align=right data-sort-value="0.62" | 620 m || 
|-id=219 bgcolor=#fefefe
| 510219 ||  || — || October 17, 2006 || Mount Lemmon || Mount Lemmon Survey || NYS || align=right data-sort-value="0.50" | 500 m || 
|-id=220 bgcolor=#fefefe
| 510220 ||  || — || November 12, 2006 || Mount Lemmon || Mount Lemmon Survey ||  || align=right data-sort-value="0.57" | 570 m || 
|-id=221 bgcolor=#fefefe
| 510221 ||  || — || February 23, 2007 || Mount Lemmon || Mount Lemmon Survey ||  || align=right data-sort-value="0.65" | 650 m || 
|-id=222 bgcolor=#fefefe
| 510222 ||  || — || November 16, 2006 || Kitt Peak || Spacewatch ||  || align=right data-sort-value="0.62" | 620 m || 
|-id=223 bgcolor=#fefefe
| 510223 ||  || — || March 6, 2011 || Kitt Peak || Spacewatch ||  || align=right data-sort-value="0.99" | 990 m || 
|-id=224 bgcolor=#fefefe
| 510224 ||  || — || November 18, 2006 || Mount Lemmon || Mount Lemmon Survey ||  || align=right data-sort-value="0.54" | 540 m || 
|-id=225 bgcolor=#fefefe
| 510225 ||  || — || December 14, 2006 || Mount Lemmon || Mount Lemmon Survey ||  || align=right data-sort-value="0.71" | 710 m || 
|-id=226 bgcolor=#fefefe
| 510226 ||  || — || March 5, 2011 || Mount Lemmon || Mount Lemmon Survey ||  || align=right data-sort-value="0.69" | 690 m || 
|-id=227 bgcolor=#fefefe
| 510227 ||  || — || March 15, 1997 || Kitt Peak || Spacewatch ||  || align=right data-sort-value="0.74" | 740 m || 
|-id=228 bgcolor=#fefefe
| 510228 ||  || — || January 10, 2011 || Mount Lemmon || Mount Lemmon Survey ||  || align=right data-sort-value="0.76" | 760 m || 
|-id=229 bgcolor=#fefefe
| 510229 ||  || — || December 13, 2006 || Kitt Peak || Spacewatch || NYS || align=right data-sort-value="0.52" | 520 m || 
|-id=230 bgcolor=#fefefe
| 510230 ||  || — || March 1, 2011 || Mount Lemmon || Mount Lemmon Survey || MAS || align=right data-sort-value="0.50" | 500 m || 
|-id=231 bgcolor=#fefefe
| 510231 ||  || — || September 20, 2009 || Mount Lemmon || Mount Lemmon Survey || V || align=right data-sort-value="0.56" | 560 m || 
|-id=232 bgcolor=#fefefe
| 510232 ||  || — || April 28, 1997 || Kitt Peak || Spacewatch ||  || align=right data-sort-value="0.68" | 680 m || 
|-id=233 bgcolor=#fefefe
| 510233 ||  || — || January 29, 2011 || Kitt Peak || Spacewatch ||  || align=right data-sort-value="0.62" | 620 m || 
|-id=234 bgcolor=#fefefe
| 510234 ||  || — || March 11, 2007 || Kitt Peak || Spacewatch ||  || align=right data-sort-value="0.86" | 860 m || 
|-id=235 bgcolor=#fefefe
| 510235 ||  || — || March 12, 2011 || Haleakala || Pan-STARRS ||  || align=right | 1.1 km || 
|-id=236 bgcolor=#fefefe
| 510236 ||  || — || March 27, 2011 || Kitt Peak || Spacewatch || NYS || align=right data-sort-value="0.59" | 590 m || 
|-id=237 bgcolor=#fefefe
| 510237 ||  || — || March 28, 2011 || Kitt Peak || Spacewatch || NYS || align=right data-sort-value="0.66" | 660 m || 
|-id=238 bgcolor=#FFC2E0
| 510238 ||  || — || March 30, 2011 || Mount Lemmon || Mount Lemmon Survey || APO || align=right data-sort-value="0.26" | 260 m || 
|-id=239 bgcolor=#fefefe
| 510239 ||  || — || February 27, 2007 || Kitt Peak || Spacewatch || MAS || align=right data-sort-value="0.69" | 690 m || 
|-id=240 bgcolor=#fefefe
| 510240 ||  || — || March 28, 2011 || Kitt Peak || Spacewatch ||  || align=right data-sort-value="0.65" | 650 m || 
|-id=241 bgcolor=#fefefe
| 510241 ||  || — || March 2, 2011 || Catalina || CSS ||  || align=right data-sort-value="0.80" | 800 m || 
|-id=242 bgcolor=#fefefe
| 510242 ||  || — || March 10, 2011 || Kitt Peak || Spacewatch || MAS || align=right data-sort-value="0.65" | 650 m || 
|-id=243 bgcolor=#fefefe
| 510243 ||  || — || January 27, 2007 || Mount Lemmon || Mount Lemmon Survey ||  || align=right data-sort-value="0.69" | 690 m || 
|-id=244 bgcolor=#fefefe
| 510244 ||  || — || February 22, 2011 || Kitt Peak || Spacewatch ||  || align=right data-sort-value="0.62" | 620 m || 
|-id=245 bgcolor=#fefefe
| 510245 ||  || — || March 31, 2011 || Haleakala || Pan-STARRS ||  || align=right data-sort-value="0.69" | 690 m || 
|-id=246 bgcolor=#fefefe
| 510246 ||  || — || January 27, 2007 || Mount Lemmon || Mount Lemmon Survey || MAS || align=right data-sort-value="0.53" | 530 m || 
|-id=247 bgcolor=#fefefe
| 510247 ||  || — || January 24, 2007 || Mount Lemmon || Mount Lemmon Survey ||  || align=right data-sort-value="0.64" | 640 m || 
|-id=248 bgcolor=#fefefe
| 510248 ||  || — || February 8, 2011 || Mount Lemmon || Mount Lemmon Survey || NYS || align=right data-sort-value="0.63" | 630 m || 
|-id=249 bgcolor=#fefefe
| 510249 ||  || — || March 24, 2011 || Kitt Peak || Spacewatch ||  || align=right data-sort-value="0.68" | 680 m || 
|-id=250 bgcolor=#fefefe
| 510250 ||  || — || April 15, 2011 || Haleakala || Pan-STARRS || H || align=right data-sort-value="0.76" | 760 m || 
|-id=251 bgcolor=#fefefe
| 510251 ||  || — || March 27, 2011 || Catalina || CSS ||  || align=right data-sort-value="0.86" | 860 m || 
|-id=252 bgcolor=#E9E9E9
| 510252 ||  || — || April 3, 2011 || Haleakala || Pan-STARRS ||  || align=right | 1.1 km || 
|-id=253 bgcolor=#fefefe
| 510253 ||  || — || February 25, 2007 || Kitt Peak || Spacewatch ||  || align=right data-sort-value="0.71" | 710 m || 
|-id=254 bgcolor=#fefefe
| 510254 ||  || — || April 24, 2011 || Haleakala || Pan-STARRS || H || align=right data-sort-value="0.60" | 600 m || 
|-id=255 bgcolor=#E9E9E9
| 510255 ||  || — || April 2, 2011 || Haleakala || Pan-STARRS ||  || align=right | 1.2 km || 
|-id=256 bgcolor=#E9E9E9
| 510256 ||  || — || April 22, 2011 || Kitt Peak || Spacewatch ||  || align=right | 1.1 km || 
|-id=257 bgcolor=#fefefe
| 510257 ||  || — || April 3, 2011 || Haleakala || Pan-STARRS ||  || align=right data-sort-value="0.67" | 670 m || 
|-id=258 bgcolor=#E9E9E9
| 510258 ||  || — || September 4, 2008 || Kitt Peak || Spacewatch ||  || align=right | 1.3 km || 
|-id=259 bgcolor=#E9E9E9
| 510259 ||  || — || June 17, 2007 || Kitt Peak || Spacewatch ||  || align=right data-sort-value="0.94" | 940 m || 
|-id=260 bgcolor=#fefefe
| 510260 ||  || — || April 13, 2011 || Catalina || CSS ||  || align=right | 1.1 km || 
|-id=261 bgcolor=#fefefe
| 510261 ||  || — || February 17, 2007 || Mount Lemmon || Mount Lemmon Survey ||  || align=right data-sort-value="0.74" | 740 m || 
|-id=262 bgcolor=#FFC2E0
| 510262 ||  || — || April 30, 2011 || Mount Lemmon || Mount Lemmon Survey || APO || align=right data-sort-value="0.49" | 490 m || 
|-id=263 bgcolor=#fefefe
| 510263 ||  || — || April 28, 2011 || Haleakala || Pan-STARRS || H || align=right data-sort-value="0.45" | 450 m || 
|-id=264 bgcolor=#fefefe
| 510264 ||  || — || April 28, 2011 || Haleakala || Pan-STARRS || H || align=right data-sort-value="0.77" | 770 m || 
|-id=265 bgcolor=#fefefe
| 510265 ||  || — || December 12, 2006 || Mount Lemmon || Mount Lemmon Survey ||  || align=right data-sort-value="0.69" | 690 m || 
|-id=266 bgcolor=#E9E9E9
| 510266 ||  || — || April 23, 2011 || Kitt Peak || Spacewatch || DOR || align=right | 2.2 km || 
|-id=267 bgcolor=#E9E9E9
| 510267 ||  || — || April 23, 2011 || Kitt Peak || Spacewatch ||  || align=right | 1.8 km || 
|-id=268 bgcolor=#fefefe
| 510268 ||  || — || March 26, 2011 || Kitt Peak || Spacewatch ||  || align=right data-sort-value="0.94" | 940 m || 
|-id=269 bgcolor=#fefefe
| 510269 ||  || — || February 25, 2007 || Mount Lemmon || Mount Lemmon Survey ||  || align=right data-sort-value="0.72" | 720 m || 
|-id=270 bgcolor=#E9E9E9
| 510270 ||  || — || April 12, 2011 || Mount Lemmon || Mount Lemmon Survey ||  || align=right data-sort-value="0.75" | 750 m || 
|-id=271 bgcolor=#fefefe
| 510271 ||  || — || April 13, 2011 || Mount Lemmon || Mount Lemmon Survey ||  || align=right data-sort-value="0.83" | 830 m || 
|-id=272 bgcolor=#E9E9E9
| 510272 ||  || — || April 28, 2011 || Haleakala || Pan-STARRS ||  || align=right | 2.4 km || 
|-id=273 bgcolor=#fefefe
| 510273 ||  || — || March 11, 2007 || Kitt Peak || Spacewatch ||  || align=right data-sort-value="0.81" | 810 m || 
|-id=274 bgcolor=#E9E9E9
| 510274 ||  || — || May 12, 2011 || Mount Lemmon || Mount Lemmon Survey ||  || align=right data-sort-value="0.83" | 830 m || 
|-id=275 bgcolor=#E9E9E9
| 510275 ||  || — || May 21, 2011 || Haleakala || Pan-STARRS ||  || align=right | 1.1 km || 
|-id=276 bgcolor=#E9E9E9
| 510276 ||  || — || May 21, 2011 || Haleakala || Pan-STARRS ||  || align=right | 1.1 km || 
|-id=277 bgcolor=#fefefe
| 510277 ||  || — || May 24, 2011 || Mount Lemmon || Mount Lemmon Survey || H || align=right data-sort-value="0.54" | 540 m || 
|-id=278 bgcolor=#E9E9E9
| 510278 ||  || — || May 22, 2011 || Kitt Peak || Spacewatch ||  || align=right | 1.8 km || 
|-id=279 bgcolor=#fefefe
| 510279 ||  || — || November 30, 2005 || Mount Lemmon || Mount Lemmon Survey ||  || align=right data-sort-value="0.91" | 910 m || 
|-id=280 bgcolor=#E9E9E9
| 510280 ||  || — || May 24, 2011 || Mount Lemmon || Mount Lemmon Survey ||  || align=right | 1.3 km || 
|-id=281 bgcolor=#FA8072
| 510281 ||  || — || May 30, 2011 || Haleakala || Pan-STARRS || H || align=right data-sort-value="0.75" | 750 m || 
|-id=282 bgcolor=#fefefe
| 510282 ||  || — || February 9, 1999 || Kitt Peak || Spacewatch ||  || align=right data-sort-value="0.78" | 780 m || 
|-id=283 bgcolor=#fefefe
| 510283 ||  || — || May 25, 2011 || Kitt Peak || Spacewatch || H || align=right data-sort-value="0.46" | 460 m || 
|-id=284 bgcolor=#E9E9E9
| 510284 ||  || — || May 30, 2011 || Haleakala || Pan-STARRS ||  || align=right | 1.5 km || 
|-id=285 bgcolor=#fefefe
| 510285 ||  || — || May 23, 2011 || Mount Lemmon || Mount Lemmon Survey ||  || align=right data-sort-value="0.62" | 620 m || 
|-id=286 bgcolor=#d6d6d6
| 510286 ||  || — || February 9, 2010 || WISE || WISE ||  || align=right | 4.8 km || 
|-id=287 bgcolor=#d6d6d6
| 510287 ||  || — || August 29, 2006 || Catalina || CSS ||  || align=right | 3.0 km || 
|-id=288 bgcolor=#fefefe
| 510288 ||  || — || May 6, 2008 || Mount Lemmon || Mount Lemmon Survey || H || align=right data-sort-value="0.73" | 730 m || 
|-id=289 bgcolor=#C2FFFF
| 510289 ||  || — || July 22, 2011 || Haleakala || Pan-STARRS || L5 || align=right | 8.9 km || 
|-id=290 bgcolor=#E9E9E9
| 510290 ||  || — || July 24, 2011 || La Sagra || OAM Obs. || BAR || align=right | 1.2 km || 
|-id=291 bgcolor=#fefefe
| 510291 ||  || — || January 12, 2010 || Mount Lemmon || Mount Lemmon Survey || H || align=right data-sort-value="0.63" | 630 m || 
|-id=292 bgcolor=#fefefe
| 510292 ||  || — || July 25, 2011 || Haleakala || Pan-STARRS ||  || align=right data-sort-value="0.90" | 900 m || 
|-id=293 bgcolor=#E9E9E9
| 510293 ||  || — || July 25, 2011 || Haleakala || Pan-STARRS ||  || align=right | 1.4 km || 
|-id=294 bgcolor=#E9E9E9
| 510294 ||  || — || July 26, 2011 || Haleakala || Pan-STARRS || (194) || align=right | 1.6 km || 
|-id=295 bgcolor=#E9E9E9
| 510295 ||  || — || July 27, 2011 || Haleakala || Pan-STARRS ||  || align=right | 1.8 km || 
|-id=296 bgcolor=#fefefe
| 510296 ||  || — || July 27, 2011 || Haleakala || Pan-STARRS || H || align=right data-sort-value="0.63" | 630 m || 
|-id=297 bgcolor=#E9E9E9
| 510297 ||  || — || July 26, 2011 || Haleakala || Pan-STARRS ||  || align=right | 2.1 km || 
|-id=298 bgcolor=#E9E9E9
| 510298 ||  || — || September 2, 2007 || Mount Lemmon || Mount Lemmon Survey ||  || align=right | 2.1 km || 
|-id=299 bgcolor=#fefefe
| 510299 ||  || — || July 27, 2011 || Haleakala || Pan-STARRS || H || align=right data-sort-value="0.65" | 650 m || 
|-id=300 bgcolor=#fefefe
| 510300 ||  || — || August 9, 2011 || Haleakala || Pan-STARRS || H || align=right data-sort-value="0.84" | 840 m || 
|}

510301–510400 

|-bgcolor=#E9E9E9
| 510301 ||  || — || August 20, 2011 || Haleakala || Pan-STARRS || HOF || align=right | 2.5 km || 
|-id=302 bgcolor=#E9E9E9
| 510302 ||  || — || June 8, 2011 || Mount Lemmon || Mount Lemmon Survey ||  || align=right | 1.3 km || 
|-id=303 bgcolor=#fefefe
| 510303 ||  || — || December 20, 2009 || Mount Lemmon || Mount Lemmon Survey || H || align=right data-sort-value="0.80" | 800 m || 
|-id=304 bgcolor=#E9E9E9
| 510304 ||  || — || August 23, 2011 || La Sagra || OAM Obs. ||  || align=right | 2.3 km || 
|-id=305 bgcolor=#E9E9E9
| 510305 ||  || — || July 31, 2011 || La Sagra || OAM Obs. ||  || align=right | 2.7 km || 
|-id=306 bgcolor=#fefefe
| 510306 ||  || — || August 25, 2011 || La Sagra || OAM Obs. || H || align=right data-sort-value="0.98" | 980 m || 
|-id=307 bgcolor=#fefefe
| 510307 ||  || — || August 26, 2011 || Haleakala || Pan-STARRS || H || align=right data-sort-value="0.66" | 660 m || 
|-id=308 bgcolor=#E9E9E9
| 510308 ||  || — || October 20, 2007 || Mount Lemmon || Mount Lemmon Survey ||  || align=right | 1.1 km || 
|-id=309 bgcolor=#fefefe
| 510309 ||  || — || February 14, 2010 || Catalina || CSS || H || align=right data-sort-value="0.86" | 860 m || 
|-id=310 bgcolor=#E9E9E9
| 510310 ||  || — || August 28, 2011 || Haleakala || Pan-STARRS ||  || align=right | 2.3 km || 
|-id=311 bgcolor=#E9E9E9
| 510311 ||  || — || August 30, 2011 || La Sagra || OAM Obs. ||  || align=right | 2.2 km || 
|-id=312 bgcolor=#E9E9E9
| 510312 ||  || — || August 2, 2011 || Haleakala || Pan-STARRS ||  || align=right | 2.9 km || 
|-id=313 bgcolor=#d6d6d6
| 510313 ||  || — || October 20, 2006 || Kitt Peak || Spacewatch ||  || align=right | 2.4 km || 
|-id=314 bgcolor=#fefefe
| 510314 ||  || — || August 23, 2011 || Haleakala || Pan-STARRS || H || align=right data-sort-value="0.65" | 650 m || 
|-id=315 bgcolor=#d6d6d6
| 510315 ||  || — || September 19, 2006 || Catalina || CSS ||  || align=right | 2.0 km || 
|-id=316 bgcolor=#d6d6d6
| 510316 ||  || — || August 31, 2011 || Haleakala || Pan-STARRS ||  || align=right | 2.5 km || 
|-id=317 bgcolor=#fefefe
| 510317 ||  || — || February 9, 2005 || Anderson Mesa || LONEOS || H || align=right data-sort-value="0.68" | 680 m || 
|-id=318 bgcolor=#fefefe
| 510318 ||  || — || September 4, 2011 || Haleakala || Pan-STARRS || H || align=right data-sort-value="0.77" | 770 m || 
|-id=319 bgcolor=#d6d6d6
| 510319 ||  || — || September 5, 2011 || Haleakala || Pan-STARRS ||  || align=right | 1.6 km || 
|-id=320 bgcolor=#d6d6d6
| 510320 ||  || — || September 4, 2011 || Haleakala || Pan-STARRS ||  || align=right | 2.8 km || 
|-id=321 bgcolor=#E9E9E9
| 510321 ||  || — || June 8, 2011 || Haleakala || Pan-STARRS ||  || align=right | 1.4 km || 
|-id=322 bgcolor=#d6d6d6
| 510322 ||  || — || September 25, 2006 || Kitt Peak || Spacewatch ||  || align=right | 1.8 km || 
|-id=323 bgcolor=#d6d6d6
| 510323 ||  || — || October 2, 2006 || Mount Lemmon || Mount Lemmon Survey ||  || align=right | 2.1 km || 
|-id=324 bgcolor=#d6d6d6
| 510324 ||  || — || September 22, 2000 || Socorro || LINEAR ||  || align=right | 2.9 km || 
|-id=325 bgcolor=#d6d6d6
| 510325 ||  || — || August 27, 2011 || Haleakala || Pan-STARRS ||  || align=right | 2.0 km || 
|-id=326 bgcolor=#d6d6d6
| 510326 ||  || — || October 19, 2006 || Mount Lemmon || Mount Lemmon Survey ||  || align=right | 2.7 km || 
|-id=327 bgcolor=#d6d6d6
| 510327 ||  || — || September 20, 2011 || Kitt Peak || Spacewatch ||  || align=right | 2.7 km || 
|-id=328 bgcolor=#fefefe
| 510328 ||  || — || September 20, 2011 || Kitt Peak || Spacewatch || H || align=right data-sort-value="0.96" | 960 m || 
|-id=329 bgcolor=#d6d6d6
| 510329 ||  || — || September 20, 2011 || Mount Lemmon || Mount Lemmon Survey ||  || align=right | 2.2 km || 
|-id=330 bgcolor=#d6d6d6
| 510330 ||  || — || August 27, 2006 || Kitt Peak || Spacewatch || KOR || align=right | 1.0 km || 
|-id=331 bgcolor=#d6d6d6
| 510331 ||  || — || November 11, 2007 || Mount Lemmon || Mount Lemmon Survey ||  || align=right | 3.3 km || 
|-id=332 bgcolor=#d6d6d6
| 510332 ||  || — || July 5, 2011 || Haleakala || Pan-STARRS ||  || align=right | 2.0 km || 
|-id=333 bgcolor=#E9E9E9
| 510333 ||  || — || April 30, 2006 || Kitt Peak || Spacewatch ||  || align=right | 1.4 km || 
|-id=334 bgcolor=#E9E9E9
| 510334 ||  || — || April 13, 1996 || Kitt Peak || Spacewatch ||  || align=right | 1.7 km || 
|-id=335 bgcolor=#d6d6d6
| 510335 ||  || — || June 9, 2011 || Haleakala || Pan-STARRS ||  || align=right | 2.4 km || 
|-id=336 bgcolor=#d6d6d6
| 510336 ||  || — || September 19, 2011 || Haleakala || Pan-STARRS || 615 || align=right | 1.1 km || 
|-id=337 bgcolor=#E9E9E9
| 510337 ||  || — || September 2, 2011 || Haleakala || Pan-STARRS || AGN || align=right | 1.2 km || 
|-id=338 bgcolor=#E9E9E9
| 510338 ||  || — || July 9, 2011 || Haleakala || Pan-STARRS || EUN || align=right | 1.3 km || 
|-id=339 bgcolor=#d6d6d6
| 510339 ||  || — || September 2, 2000 || Anderson Mesa || LONEOS ||  || align=right | 2.8 km || 
|-id=340 bgcolor=#d6d6d6
| 510340 ||  || — || September 2, 2000 || Anderson Mesa || LONEOS || TIR || align=right | 3.3 km || 
|-id=341 bgcolor=#d6d6d6
| 510341 ||  || — || August 23, 2011 || La Sagra || OAM Obs. ||  || align=right | 2.4 km || 
|-id=342 bgcolor=#E9E9E9
| 510342 ||  || — || August 29, 2011 || La Sagra || OAM Obs. ||  || align=right | 2.5 km || 
|-id=343 bgcolor=#d6d6d6
| 510343 ||  || — || September 21, 2011 || Catalina || CSS || KOR || align=right | 1.5 km || 
|-id=344 bgcolor=#d6d6d6
| 510344 ||  || — || September 18, 2011 || Mount Lemmon || Mount Lemmon Survey ||  || align=right | 2.7 km || 
|-id=345 bgcolor=#d6d6d6
| 510345 ||  || — || April 9, 2008 || Kitt Peak || Spacewatch || TIR || align=right | 3.0 km || 
|-id=346 bgcolor=#d6d6d6
| 510346 ||  || — || September 30, 2006 || Mount Lemmon || Mount Lemmon Survey ||  || align=right | 2.5 km || 
|-id=347 bgcolor=#d6d6d6
| 510347 ||  || — || September 18, 2006 || Kitt Peak || Spacewatch ||  || align=right | 1.7 km || 
|-id=348 bgcolor=#d6d6d6
| 510348 ||  || — || September 23, 2011 || Kitt Peak || Spacewatch ||  || align=right | 2.5 km || 
|-id=349 bgcolor=#d6d6d6
| 510349 ||  || — || October 31, 2006 || Kitt Peak || Spacewatch ||  || align=right | 1.8 km || 
|-id=350 bgcolor=#d6d6d6
| 510350 ||  || — || September 26, 2011 || Kitt Peak || Spacewatch || EOS || align=right | 1.8 km || 
|-id=351 bgcolor=#d6d6d6
| 510351 ||  || — || September 4, 2011 || Haleakala || Pan-STARRS ||  || align=right | 2.5 km || 
|-id=352 bgcolor=#d6d6d6
| 510352 ||  || — || September 2, 2011 || Haleakala || Pan-STARRS || KOR || align=right | 1.2 km || 
|-id=353 bgcolor=#E9E9E9
| 510353 ||  || — || September 2, 2011 || Haleakala || Pan-STARRS ||  || align=right | 1.2 km || 
|-id=354 bgcolor=#d6d6d6
| 510354 ||  || — || August 20, 2011 || Haleakala || Pan-STARRS ||  || align=right | 2.1 km || 
|-id=355 bgcolor=#E9E9E9
| 510355 ||  || — || September 2, 2011 || Haleakala || Pan-STARRS || WIT || align=right data-sort-value="0.93" | 930 m || 
|-id=356 bgcolor=#d6d6d6
| 510356 ||  || — || November 20, 2006 || Kitt Peak || Spacewatch ||  || align=right | 2.2 km || 
|-id=357 bgcolor=#d6d6d6
| 510357 ||  || — || September 23, 2011 || Kitt Peak || Spacewatch ||  || align=right | 2.9 km || 
|-id=358 bgcolor=#d6d6d6
| 510358 ||  || — || September 27, 2011 || Mount Lemmon || Mount Lemmon Survey ||  || align=right | 2.7 km || 
|-id=359 bgcolor=#d6d6d6
| 510359 ||  || — || September 15, 2006 || Kitt Peak || Spacewatch || KOR || align=right | 1.2 km || 
|-id=360 bgcolor=#d6d6d6
| 510360 ||  || — || September 26, 2006 || Kitt Peak || Spacewatch ||  || align=right | 1.7 km || 
|-id=361 bgcolor=#d6d6d6
| 510361 ||  || — || October 17, 1995 || Kitt Peak || Spacewatch ||  || align=right | 2.5 km || 
|-id=362 bgcolor=#d6d6d6
| 510362 ||  || — || July 16, 2010 || WISE || WISE ||  || align=right | 3.2 km || 
|-id=363 bgcolor=#E9E9E9
| 510363 ||  || — || September 24, 2011 || Haleakala || Pan-STARRS ||  || align=right | 2.5 km || 
|-id=364 bgcolor=#E9E9E9
| 510364 ||  || — || November 8, 2007 || Mount Lemmon || Mount Lemmon Survey ||  || align=right | 1.9 km || 
|-id=365 bgcolor=#E9E9E9
| 510365 ||  || — || August 20, 2011 || Haleakala || Pan-STARRS ||  || align=right | 2.1 km || 
|-id=366 bgcolor=#d6d6d6
| 510366 ||  || — || September 24, 2011 || Haleakala || Pan-STARRS ||  || align=right | 2.7 km || 
|-id=367 bgcolor=#E9E9E9
| 510367 ||  || — || September 24, 2011 || Haleakala || Pan-STARRS ||  || align=right | 2.0 km || 
|-id=368 bgcolor=#E9E9E9
| 510368 ||  || — || September 24, 2011 || Haleakala || Pan-STARRS ||  || align=right | 2.6 km || 
|-id=369 bgcolor=#E9E9E9
| 510369 ||  || — || September 4, 2011 || Haleakala || Pan-STARRS ||  || align=right | 2.3 km || 
|-id=370 bgcolor=#d6d6d6
| 510370 ||  || — || September 24, 2011 || Haleakala || Pan-STARRS || EOS || align=right | 1.7 km || 
|-id=371 bgcolor=#d6d6d6
| 510371 ||  || — || October 18, 2011 || Mount Lemmon || Mount Lemmon Survey ||  || align=right | 2.7 km || 
|-id=372 bgcolor=#d6d6d6
| 510372 ||  || — || September 24, 2011 || Haleakala || Pan-STARRS || EOS || align=right | 1.7 km || 
|-id=373 bgcolor=#d6d6d6
| 510373 ||  || — || September 23, 2011 || Kitt Peak || Spacewatch ||  || align=right | 2.6 km || 
|-id=374 bgcolor=#d6d6d6
| 510374 ||  || — || September 25, 2005 || Kitt Peak || Spacewatch ||  || align=right | 2.2 km || 
|-id=375 bgcolor=#d6d6d6
| 510375 ||  || — || September 23, 2011 || Kitt Peak || Spacewatch ||  || align=right | 2.3 km || 
|-id=376 bgcolor=#d6d6d6
| 510376 ||  || — || September 27, 2011 || Mount Lemmon || Mount Lemmon Survey ||  || align=right | 2.9 km || 
|-id=377 bgcolor=#d6d6d6
| 510377 ||  || — || September 24, 2011 || Haleakala || Pan-STARRS ||  || align=right | 3.3 km || 
|-id=378 bgcolor=#d6d6d6
| 510378 ||  || — || September 22, 2011 || Kitt Peak || Spacewatch ||  || align=right | 2.1 km || 
|-id=379 bgcolor=#d6d6d6
| 510379 ||  || — || September 26, 2011 || Kitt Peak || Spacewatch || EOS || align=right | 1.6 km || 
|-id=380 bgcolor=#d6d6d6
| 510380 ||  || — || September 24, 2011 || Haleakala || Pan-STARRS ||  || align=right | 2.2 km || 
|-id=381 bgcolor=#d6d6d6
| 510381 ||  || — || October 18, 2011 || Kitt Peak || Spacewatch ||  || align=right | 2.7 km || 
|-id=382 bgcolor=#d6d6d6
| 510382 ||  || — || October 18, 2011 || Kitt Peak || Spacewatch || LIX || align=right | 2.6 km || 
|-id=383 bgcolor=#d6d6d6
| 510383 ||  || — || December 16, 2006 || Mount Lemmon || Mount Lemmon Survey ||  || align=right | 2.4 km || 
|-id=384 bgcolor=#d6d6d6
| 510384 ||  || — || September 2, 2010 || La Sagra || OAM Obs. ||  || align=right | 4.1 km || 
|-id=385 bgcolor=#d6d6d6
| 510385 ||  || — || October 19, 2011 || Kitt Peak || Spacewatch ||  || align=right | 2.2 km || 
|-id=386 bgcolor=#d6d6d6
| 510386 ||  || — || October 19, 2011 || Kitt Peak || Spacewatch ||  || align=right | 1.8 km || 
|-id=387 bgcolor=#d6d6d6
| 510387 ||  || — || October 19, 2011 || Kitt Peak || Spacewatch ||  || align=right | 2.0 km || 
|-id=388 bgcolor=#d6d6d6
| 510388 ||  || — || October 19, 2011 || Kitt Peak || Spacewatch ||  || align=right | 3.1 km || 
|-id=389 bgcolor=#d6d6d6
| 510389 ||  || — || August 30, 2005 || Kitt Peak || Spacewatch ||  || align=right | 1.9 km || 
|-id=390 bgcolor=#d6d6d6
| 510390 ||  || — || September 17, 2006 || Kitt Peak || Spacewatch || KOR || align=right | 1.1 km || 
|-id=391 bgcolor=#d6d6d6
| 510391 ||  || — || October 20, 2011 || Kitt Peak || Spacewatch || EOS || align=right | 1.5 km || 
|-id=392 bgcolor=#d6d6d6
| 510392 ||  || — || November 19, 2006 || Kitt Peak || Spacewatch ||  || align=right | 3.0 km || 
|-id=393 bgcolor=#d6d6d6
| 510393 ||  || — || October 24, 2011 || Mount Lemmon || Mount Lemmon Survey ||  || align=right | 2.6 km || 
|-id=394 bgcolor=#d6d6d6
| 510394 ||  || — || October 24, 2011 || Mount Lemmon || Mount Lemmon Survey ||  || align=right | 3.2 km || 
|-id=395 bgcolor=#d6d6d6
| 510395 ||  || — || December 5, 2007 || Kitt Peak || Spacewatch ||  || align=right | 2.5 km || 
|-id=396 bgcolor=#d6d6d6
| 510396 ||  || — || September 20, 2011 || Kitt Peak || Spacewatch ||  || align=right | 1.9 km || 
|-id=397 bgcolor=#d6d6d6
| 510397 ||  || — || October 20, 2011 || Kitt Peak || Spacewatch ||  || align=right | 1.9 km || 
|-id=398 bgcolor=#d6d6d6
| 510398 ||  || — || September 25, 2011 || Haleakala || Pan-STARRS || LIX || align=right | 2.9 km || 
|-id=399 bgcolor=#E9E9E9
| 510399 ||  || — || September 21, 2011 || Kitt Peak || Spacewatch ||  || align=right | 2.0 km || 
|-id=400 bgcolor=#d6d6d6
| 510400 ||  || — || October 29, 2005 || Catalina || CSS || 7:4 || align=right | 3.0 km || 
|}

510401–510500 

|-bgcolor=#d6d6d6
| 510401 ||  || — || March 31, 2008 || Kitt Peak || Spacewatch ||  || align=right | 2.5 km || 
|-id=402 bgcolor=#d6d6d6
| 510402 ||  || — || October 23, 2011 || Kitt Peak || Spacewatch ||  || align=right | 2.5 km || 
|-id=403 bgcolor=#d6d6d6
| 510403 ||  || — || October 23, 2011 || Kitt Peak || Spacewatch ||  || align=right | 2.7 km || 
|-id=404 bgcolor=#d6d6d6
| 510404 ||  || — || October 24, 2011 || Haleakala || Pan-STARRS || EMA || align=right | 2.9 km || 
|-id=405 bgcolor=#d6d6d6
| 510405 ||  || — || December 21, 2006 || Kitt Peak || Spacewatch ||  || align=right | 3.1 km || 
|-id=406 bgcolor=#d6d6d6
| 510406 ||  || — || November 24, 2006 || Kitt Peak || Spacewatch ||  || align=right | 2.8 km || 
|-id=407 bgcolor=#d6d6d6
| 510407 ||  || — || September 24, 2011 || Mount Lemmon || Mount Lemmon Survey ||  || align=right | 2.4 km || 
|-id=408 bgcolor=#d6d6d6
| 510408 ||  || — || October 24, 2011 || Kitt Peak || Spacewatch ||  || align=right | 2.6 km || 
|-id=409 bgcolor=#d6d6d6
| 510409 ||  || — || December 31, 2007 || Kitt Peak || Spacewatch || 615 || align=right | 1.8 km || 
|-id=410 bgcolor=#FA8072
| 510410 ||  || — || October 28, 2011 || Mount Lemmon || Mount Lemmon Survey ||  || align=right data-sort-value="0.39" | 390 m || 
|-id=411 bgcolor=#d6d6d6
| 510411 ||  || — || December 15, 2006 || Kitt Peak || Spacewatch ||  || align=right | 2.6 km || 
|-id=412 bgcolor=#d6d6d6
| 510412 ||  || — || September 28, 2011 || Kitt Peak || Spacewatch ||  || align=right | 2.3 km || 
|-id=413 bgcolor=#d6d6d6
| 510413 ||  || — || April 14, 2004 || Kitt Peak || Spacewatch ||  || align=right | 2.2 km || 
|-id=414 bgcolor=#d6d6d6
| 510414 ||  || — || October 26, 2011 || Haleakala || Pan-STARRS ||  || align=right | 2.1 km || 
|-id=415 bgcolor=#d6d6d6
| 510415 ||  || — || October 26, 2011 || Haleakala || Pan-STARRS ||  || align=right | 1.8 km || 
|-id=416 bgcolor=#d6d6d6
| 510416 ||  || — || October 24, 2011 || Haleakala || Pan-STARRS ||  || align=right | 2.7 km || 
|-id=417 bgcolor=#d6d6d6
| 510417 ||  || — || October 25, 2011 || Haleakala || Pan-STARRS ||  || align=right | 3.5 km || 
|-id=418 bgcolor=#d6d6d6
| 510418 ||  || — || October 26, 2011 || Haleakala || Pan-STARRS ||  || align=right | 3.0 km || 
|-id=419 bgcolor=#d6d6d6
| 510419 ||  || — || September 23, 2011 || Haleakala || Pan-STARRS ||  || align=right | 3.1 km || 
|-id=420 bgcolor=#d6d6d6
| 510420 ||  || — || October 23, 2011 || Kitt Peak || Spacewatch ||  || align=right | 2.8 km || 
|-id=421 bgcolor=#FA8072
| 510421 ||  || — || September 24, 2011 || Mount Lemmon || Mount Lemmon Survey ||  || align=right | 2.0 km || 
|-id=422 bgcolor=#d6d6d6
| 510422 ||  || — || May 8, 2010 || WISE || WISE ||  || align=right | 2.1 km || 
|-id=423 bgcolor=#d6d6d6
| 510423 ||  || — || November 22, 2006 || Mount Lemmon || Mount Lemmon Survey ||  || align=right | 4.1 km || 
|-id=424 bgcolor=#d6d6d6
| 510424 ||  || — || September 25, 2011 || Haleakala || Pan-STARRS ||  || align=right | 2.0 km || 
|-id=425 bgcolor=#d6d6d6
| 510425 ||  || — || May 4, 2009 || Mount Lemmon || Mount Lemmon Survey ||  || align=right | 3.5 km || 
|-id=426 bgcolor=#d6d6d6
| 510426 ||  || — || October 26, 2011 || Haleakala || Pan-STARRS ||  || align=right | 3.1 km || 
|-id=427 bgcolor=#d6d6d6
| 510427 ||  || — || September 24, 2011 || Haleakala || Pan-STARRS || EOS || align=right | 2.2 km || 
|-id=428 bgcolor=#E9E9E9
| 510428 ||  || — || June 9, 2011 || Haleakala || Pan-STARRS ||  || align=right data-sort-value="0.79" | 790 m || 
|-id=429 bgcolor=#d6d6d6
| 510429 ||  || — || October 18, 1995 || Kitt Peak || Spacewatch || SHU3:2 || align=right | 4.3 km || 
|-id=430 bgcolor=#d6d6d6
| 510430 ||  || — || September 25, 2006 || Kitt Peak || Spacewatch || KOR || align=right | 1.1 km || 
|-id=431 bgcolor=#d6d6d6
| 510431 ||  || — || December 21, 2006 || Kitt Peak || Spacewatch ||  || align=right | 1.8 km || 
|-id=432 bgcolor=#d6d6d6
| 510432 ||  || — || October 19, 2011 || Kitt Peak || Spacewatch ||  || align=right | 2.6 km || 
|-id=433 bgcolor=#d6d6d6
| 510433 ||  || — || March 28, 2008 || Mount Lemmon || Mount Lemmon Survey ||  || align=right | 1.9 km || 
|-id=434 bgcolor=#d6d6d6
| 510434 ||  || — || October 25, 2011 || Haleakala || Pan-STARRS ||  || align=right | 3.0 km || 
|-id=435 bgcolor=#d6d6d6
| 510435 ||  || — || October 25, 2011 || Haleakala || Pan-STARRS ||  || align=right | 3.4 km || 
|-id=436 bgcolor=#d6d6d6
| 510436 ||  || — || September 24, 2011 || Haleakala || Pan-STARRS ||  || align=right | 3.2 km || 
|-id=437 bgcolor=#d6d6d6
| 510437 ||  || — || September 14, 2005 || Kitt Peak || Spacewatch || LIX || align=right | 3.4 km || 
|-id=438 bgcolor=#d6d6d6
| 510438 ||  || — || October 26, 2011 || Haleakala || Pan-STARRS ||  || align=right | 2.7 km || 
|-id=439 bgcolor=#d6d6d6
| 510439 ||  || — || July 28, 2005 || Siding Spring || SSS || Tj (2.95) || align=right | 3.8 km || 
|-id=440 bgcolor=#d6d6d6
| 510440 ||  || — || October 26, 2011 || Haleakala || Pan-STARRS ||  || align=right | 2.6 km || 
|-id=441 bgcolor=#d6d6d6
| 510441 ||  || — || October 25, 2011 || Haleakala || Pan-STARRS ||  || align=right | 3.8 km || 
|-id=442 bgcolor=#fefefe
| 510442 ||  || — || November 17, 2006 || Mount Lemmon || Mount Lemmon Survey || H || align=right data-sort-value="0.84" | 840 m || 
|-id=443 bgcolor=#d6d6d6
| 510443 ||  || — || October 6, 2005 || Kitt Peak || Spacewatch ||  || align=right | 2.3 km || 
|-id=444 bgcolor=#d6d6d6
| 510444 ||  || — || October 17, 2011 || Kitt Peak || Spacewatch ||  || align=right | 2.5 km || 
|-id=445 bgcolor=#d6d6d6
| 510445 ||  || — || March 12, 2008 || Kitt Peak || Spacewatch ||  || align=right | 2.6 km || 
|-id=446 bgcolor=#d6d6d6
| 510446 ||  || — || October 26, 2011 || Haleakala || Pan-STARRS ||  || align=right | 3.2 km || 
|-id=447 bgcolor=#d6d6d6
| 510447 ||  || — || October 26, 2011 || Haleakala || Pan-STARRS ||  || align=right | 2.3 km || 
|-id=448 bgcolor=#d6d6d6
| 510448 ||  || — || October 26, 2011 || Haleakala || Pan-STARRS ||  || align=right | 2.7 km || 
|-id=449 bgcolor=#d6d6d6
| 510449 ||  || — || November 3, 2011 || Kitt Peak || Spacewatch ||  || align=right | 2.2 km || 
|-id=450 bgcolor=#d6d6d6
| 510450 ||  || — || March 12, 2008 || Mount Lemmon || Mount Lemmon Survey ||  || align=right | 1.9 km || 
|-id=451 bgcolor=#d6d6d6
| 510451 ||  || — || October 18, 2011 || Catalina || CSS ||  || align=right | 2.7 km || 
|-id=452 bgcolor=#d6d6d6
| 510452 ||  || — || October 25, 2011 || Haleakala || Pan-STARRS ||  || align=right | 3.3 km || 
|-id=453 bgcolor=#d6d6d6
| 510453 ||  || — || October 23, 2011 || Kitt Peak || Spacewatch ||  || align=right | 3.3 km || 
|-id=454 bgcolor=#d6d6d6
| 510454 ||  || — || October 25, 2011 || Haleakala || Pan-STARRS ||  || align=right | 2.2 km || 
|-id=455 bgcolor=#d6d6d6
| 510455 ||  || — || February 23, 2007 || Kitt Peak || Spacewatch ||  || align=right | 1.8 km || 
|-id=456 bgcolor=#d6d6d6
| 510456 ||  || — || April 9, 2010 || Kitt Peak || Spacewatch ||  || align=right | 2.5 km || 
|-id=457 bgcolor=#d6d6d6
| 510457 ||  || — || October 26, 2011 || Haleakala || Pan-STARRS ||  || align=right | 2.2 km || 
|-id=458 bgcolor=#d6d6d6
| 510458 ||  || — || October 18, 2011 || Haleakala || Pan-STARRS ||  || align=right | 2.5 km || 
|-id=459 bgcolor=#d6d6d6
| 510459 ||  || — || March 12, 2007 || Catalina || CSS ||  || align=right | 2.5 km || 
|-id=460 bgcolor=#d6d6d6
| 510460 ||  || — || October 25, 2011 || Haleakala || Pan-STARRS ||  || align=right | 3.4 km || 
|-id=461 bgcolor=#d6d6d6
| 510461 ||  || — || October 20, 2011 || Mount Lemmon || Mount Lemmon Survey ||  || align=right | 1.9 km || 
|-id=462 bgcolor=#d6d6d6
| 510462 ||  || — || October 26, 2011 || Haleakala || Pan-STARRS || EOS || align=right | 1.9 km || 
|-id=463 bgcolor=#d6d6d6
| 510463 ||  || — || October 26, 2011 || Haleakala || Pan-STARRS ||  || align=right | 2.3 km || 
|-id=464 bgcolor=#d6d6d6
| 510464 ||  || — || October 26, 2011 || Haleakala || Pan-STARRS ||  || align=right | 2.3 km || 
|-id=465 bgcolor=#d6d6d6
| 510465 ||  || — || March 4, 2008 || Mount Lemmon || Mount Lemmon Survey || EOS || align=right | 1.6 km || 
|-id=466 bgcolor=#fefefe
| 510466 Varna ||  ||  || November 24, 2011 || Haleakala || Pan-STARRS || H || align=right data-sort-value="0.83" | 830 m || 
|-id=467 bgcolor=#d6d6d6
| 510467 ||  || — || October 24, 2011 || Haleakala || Pan-STARRS ||  || align=right | 3.8 km || 
|-id=468 bgcolor=#d6d6d6
| 510468 ||  || — || November 1, 2011 || Mount Lemmon || Mount Lemmon Survey || TIR || align=right | 2.8 km || 
|-id=469 bgcolor=#fefefe
| 510469 ||  || — || June 1, 2005 || Kitt Peak || Spacewatch || H || align=right data-sort-value="0.85" | 850 m || 
|-id=470 bgcolor=#d6d6d6
| 510470 ||  || — || October 26, 2011 || Haleakala || Pan-STARRS ||  || align=right | 2.3 km || 
|-id=471 bgcolor=#d6d6d6
| 510471 ||  || — || October 26, 2011 || Haleakala || Pan-STARRS ||  || align=right | 2.4 km || 
|-id=472 bgcolor=#d6d6d6
| 510472 ||  || — || October 23, 2011 || Haleakala || Pan-STARRS ||  || align=right | 3.1 km || 
|-id=473 bgcolor=#d6d6d6
| 510473 ||  || — || November 26, 2011 || Kitt Peak || Spacewatch ||  || align=right | 2.2 km || 
|-id=474 bgcolor=#d6d6d6
| 510474 ||  || — || October 29, 2005 || Mount Lemmon || Mount Lemmon Survey ||  || align=right | 2.8 km || 
|-id=475 bgcolor=#d6d6d6
| 510475 ||  || — || October 7, 2005 || Mount Lemmon || Mount Lemmon Survey || EOS || align=right | 1.5 km || 
|-id=476 bgcolor=#d6d6d6
| 510476 ||  || — || October 23, 2011 || Haleakala || Pan-STARRS || EOS || align=right | 2.2 km || 
|-id=477 bgcolor=#d6d6d6
| 510477 ||  || — || October 25, 2011 || Haleakala || Pan-STARRS ||  || align=right | 3.3 km || 
|-id=478 bgcolor=#d6d6d6
| 510478 ||  || — || January 24, 2007 || Mount Lemmon || Mount Lemmon Survey ||  || align=right | 1.9 km || 
|-id=479 bgcolor=#d6d6d6
| 510479 ||  || — || September 24, 2011 || Haleakala || Pan-STARRS || EOS || align=right | 1.9 km || 
|-id=480 bgcolor=#d6d6d6
| 510480 ||  || — || October 26, 2011 || Haleakala || Pan-STARRS ||  || align=right | 2.8 km || 
|-id=481 bgcolor=#d6d6d6
| 510481 ||  || — || October 25, 2011 || Haleakala || Pan-STARRS ||  || align=right | 3.4 km || 
|-id=482 bgcolor=#d6d6d6
| 510482 ||  || — || November 18, 2011 || Mount Lemmon || Mount Lemmon Survey ||  || align=right | 4.0 km || 
|-id=483 bgcolor=#d6d6d6
| 510483 ||  || — || November 24, 2011 || Mount Lemmon || Mount Lemmon Survey ||  || align=right | 3.2 km || 
|-id=484 bgcolor=#d6d6d6
| 510484 ||  || — || November 1, 2006 || Mount Lemmon || Mount Lemmon Survey ||  || align=right | 2.1 km || 
|-id=485 bgcolor=#d6d6d6
| 510485 ||  || — || October 26, 2011 || Haleakala || Pan-STARRS ||  || align=right | 2.2 km || 
|-id=486 bgcolor=#d6d6d6
| 510486 ||  || — || April 14, 2008 || Mount Lemmon || Mount Lemmon Survey ||  || align=right | 2.7 km || 
|-id=487 bgcolor=#d6d6d6
| 510487 ||  || — || November 29, 2011 || Kitt Peak || Spacewatch ||  || align=right | 2.8 km || 
|-id=488 bgcolor=#d6d6d6
| 510488 ||  || — || October 24, 2011 || Haleakala || Pan-STARRS ||  || align=right | 3.7 km || 
|-id=489 bgcolor=#d6d6d6
| 510489 ||  || — || December 6, 2011 || Haleakala || Pan-STARRS ||  || align=right | 3.1 km || 
|-id=490 bgcolor=#fefefe
| 510490 ||  || — || December 16, 2011 || Haleakala || Pan-STARRS || H || align=right data-sort-value="0.79" | 790 m || 
|-id=491 bgcolor=#d6d6d6
| 510491 ||  || — || January 9, 2002 || Kitt Peak || Spacewatch ||  || align=right | 2.6 km || 
|-id=492 bgcolor=#d6d6d6
| 510492 ||  || — || November 24, 2011 || Mount Lemmon || Mount Lemmon Survey ||  || align=right | 2.8 km || 
|-id=493 bgcolor=#d6d6d6
| 510493 ||  || — || December 26, 2011 || Kitt Peak || Spacewatch ||  || align=right | 2.9 km || 
|-id=494 bgcolor=#d6d6d6
| 510494 ||  || — || May 13, 2008 || Mount Lemmon || Mount Lemmon Survey ||  || align=right | 5.9 km || 
|-id=495 bgcolor=#d6d6d6
| 510495 ||  || — || December 25, 2011 || Kitt Peak || Spacewatch ||  || align=right | 2.7 km || 
|-id=496 bgcolor=#d6d6d6
| 510496 ||  || — || December 28, 2011 || Mount Lemmon || Mount Lemmon Survey ||  || align=right | 3.2 km || 
|-id=497 bgcolor=#d6d6d6
| 510497 ||  || — || December 25, 2011 || Mount Lemmon || Mount Lemmon Survey ||  || align=right | 3.1 km || 
|-id=498 bgcolor=#d6d6d6
| 510498 ||  || — || December 27, 2011 || Kitt Peak || Spacewatch ||  || align=right | 3.6 km || 
|-id=499 bgcolor=#d6d6d6
| 510499 ||  || — || December 27, 2011 || Kitt Peak || Spacewatch ||  || align=right | 4.0 km || 
|-id=500 bgcolor=#C2FFFF
| 510500 ||  || — || December 25, 2011 || Mount Lemmon || Mount Lemmon Survey || L4 || align=right | 8.8 km || 
|}

510501–510600 

|-bgcolor=#d6d6d6
| 510501 ||  || — || December 27, 2011 || Kitt Peak || Spacewatch || TIR || align=right | 2.9 km || 
|-id=502 bgcolor=#d6d6d6
| 510502 ||  || — || January 24, 2007 || Mount Lemmon || Mount Lemmon Survey ||  || align=right | 2.5 km || 
|-id=503 bgcolor=#C2FFFF
| 510503 ||  || — || December 13, 2004 || Kitt Peak || Spacewatch || L5 || align=right | 13 km || 
|-id=504 bgcolor=#d6d6d6
| 510504 ||  || — || January 4, 2012 || Kitt Peak || Spacewatch ||  || align=right | 2.3 km || 
|-id=505 bgcolor=#C2FFFF
| 510505 ||  || — || September 4, 2008 || Kitt Peak || Spacewatch || L4 || align=right | 6.4 km || 
|-id=506 bgcolor=#d6d6d6
| 510506 ||  || — || December 10, 2005 || Kitt Peak || Spacewatch ||  || align=right | 3.1 km || 
|-id=507 bgcolor=#d6d6d6
| 510507 ||  || — || October 24, 2011 || Mount Lemmon || Mount Lemmon Survey || ARM || align=right | 3.7 km || 
|-id=508 bgcolor=#C2FFFF
| 510508 ||  || — || August 24, 2008 || Kitt Peak || Spacewatch || L4 || align=right | 9.2 km || 
|-id=509 bgcolor=#d6d6d6
| 510509 ||  || — || October 5, 2005 || Catalina || CSS ||  || align=right | 2.5 km || 
|-id=510 bgcolor=#d6d6d6
| 510510 ||  || — || January 2, 2012 || Kitt Peak || Spacewatch ||  || align=right | 3.1 km || 
|-id=511 bgcolor=#d6d6d6
| 510511 ||  || — || January 21, 2012 || Haleakala || Pan-STARRS ||  || align=right | 2.5 km || 
|-id=512 bgcolor=#d6d6d6
| 510512 ||  || — || December 25, 2011 || Kitt Peak || Spacewatch ||  || align=right | 3.9 km || 
|-id=513 bgcolor=#d6d6d6
| 510513 ||  || — || January 18, 2012 || Kitt Peak || Spacewatch || EUP || align=right | 3.6 km || 
|-id=514 bgcolor=#d6d6d6
| 510514 ||  || — || August 13, 2010 || Kitt Peak || Spacewatch ||  || align=right | 2.7 km || 
|-id=515 bgcolor=#C2FFFF
| 510515 ||  || — || December 15, 2010 || Mount Lemmon || Mount Lemmon Survey || L4 || align=right | 8.2 km || 
|-id=516 bgcolor=#d6d6d6
| 510516 ||  || — || January 26, 2012 || Haleakala || Pan-STARRS ||  || align=right | 2.9 km || 
|-id=517 bgcolor=#d6d6d6
| 510517 ||  || — || January 18, 2012 || Kitt Peak || Spacewatch || EOS || align=right | 2.2 km || 
|-id=518 bgcolor=#d6d6d6
| 510518 ||  || — || January 1, 2012 || Mount Lemmon || Mount Lemmon Survey || LIX || align=right | 3.5 km || 
|-id=519 bgcolor=#C2FFFF
| 510519 ||  || — || September 12, 2007 || Mount Lemmon || Mount Lemmon Survey || L4 || align=right | 7.6 km || 
|-id=520 bgcolor=#C2FFFF
| 510520 ||  || — || October 25, 2009 || Kitt Peak || Spacewatch || L4 || align=right | 6.9 km || 
|-id=521 bgcolor=#d6d6d6
| 510521 ||  || — || January 19, 2012 || Haleakala || Pan-STARRS || 3:2 || align=right | 3.5 km || 
|-id=522 bgcolor=#d6d6d6
| 510522 ||  || — || February 1, 2012 || Kitt Peak || Spacewatch ||  || align=right | 2.9 km || 
|-id=523 bgcolor=#d6d6d6
| 510523 ||  || — || July 28, 2010 || WISE || WISE ||  || align=right | 2.4 km || 
|-id=524 bgcolor=#d6d6d6
| 510524 ||  || — || January 18, 2012 || Catalina || CSS ||  || align=right | 3.0 km || 
|-id=525 bgcolor=#d6d6d6
| 510525 ||  || — || January 4, 2006 || Kitt Peak || Spacewatch ||  || align=right | 2.7 km || 
|-id=526 bgcolor=#d6d6d6
| 510526 ||  || — || February 20, 2012 || Haleakala || Pan-STARRS ||  || align=right | 4.2 km || 
|-id=527 bgcolor=#fefefe
| 510527 ||  || — || February 28, 2012 || Haleakala || Pan-STARRS ||  || align=right data-sort-value="0.70" | 700 m || 
|-id=528 bgcolor=#fefefe
| 510528 ||  || — || February 24, 2012 || Haleakala || Pan-STARRS ||  || align=right data-sort-value="0.84" | 840 m || 
|-id=529 bgcolor=#FFC2E0
| 510529 ||  || — || March 14, 2012 || Mount Lemmon || Mount Lemmon Survey || APOPHAcritical || align=right data-sort-value="0.16" | 160 m || 
|-id=530 bgcolor=#fefefe
| 510530 ||  || — || February 22, 2012 || Kitt Peak || Spacewatch ||  || align=right data-sort-value="0.50" | 500 m || 
|-id=531 bgcolor=#fefefe
| 510531 ||  || — || February 28, 2012 || Haleakala || Pan-STARRS ||  || align=right data-sort-value="0.71" | 710 m || 
|-id=532 bgcolor=#fefefe
| 510532 ||  || — || February 28, 2012 || Haleakala || Pan-STARRS ||  || align=right data-sort-value="0.56" | 560 m || 
|-id=533 bgcolor=#fefefe
| 510533 ||  || — || March 2, 2012 || Catalina || CSS ||  || align=right data-sort-value="0.67" | 670 m || 
|-id=534 bgcolor=#fefefe
| 510534 ||  || — || September 16, 2003 || Kitt Peak || Spacewatch ||  || align=right data-sort-value="0.95" | 950 m || 
|-id=535 bgcolor=#E9E9E9
| 510535 ||  || — || March 29, 2012 || Kitt Peak || Spacewatch ||  || align=right | 1.6 km || 
|-id=536 bgcolor=#fefefe
| 510536 ||  || — || March 29, 2012 || Haleakala || Pan-STARRS ||  || align=right data-sort-value="0.75" | 750 m || 
|-id=537 bgcolor=#fefefe
| 510537 ||  || — || March 13, 2012 || Mount Lemmon || Mount Lemmon Survey ||  || align=right data-sort-value="0.62" | 620 m || 
|-id=538 bgcolor=#fefefe
| 510538 ||  || — || April 15, 2012 || Haleakala || Pan-STARRS ||  || align=right data-sort-value="0.64" | 640 m || 
|-id=539 bgcolor=#fefefe
| 510539 ||  || — || April 17, 2012 || Catalina || CSS ||  || align=right data-sort-value="0.78" | 780 m || 
|-id=540 bgcolor=#fefefe
| 510540 ||  || — || August 1, 2009 || Kitt Peak || Spacewatch ||  || align=right data-sort-value="0.67" | 670 m || 
|-id=541 bgcolor=#fefefe
| 510541 ||  || — || March 29, 2012 || Mount Lemmon || Mount Lemmon Survey ||  || align=right data-sort-value="0.62" | 620 m || 
|-id=542 bgcolor=#fefefe
| 510542 ||  || — || June 21, 2009 || Kitt Peak || Spacewatch ||  || align=right data-sort-value="0.65" | 650 m || 
|-id=543 bgcolor=#fefefe
| 510543 ||  || — || April 15, 2008 || Mount Lemmon || Mount Lemmon Survey ||  || align=right data-sort-value="0.87" | 870 m || 
|-id=544 bgcolor=#fefefe
| 510544 ||  || — || April 8, 2008 || Mount Lemmon || Mount Lemmon Survey || NYS || align=right data-sort-value="0.50" | 500 m || 
|-id=545 bgcolor=#fefefe
| 510545 ||  || — || April 28, 2012 || Mount Lemmon || Mount Lemmon Survey ||  || align=right data-sort-value="0.54" | 540 m || 
|-id=546 bgcolor=#C2FFFF
| 510546 ||  || — || February 20, 2002 || Kitt Peak || Spacewatch || L4 || align=right | 7.6 km || 
|-id=547 bgcolor=#fefefe
| 510547 ||  || — || April 20, 2012 || Kitt Peak || Spacewatch ||  || align=right data-sort-value="0.67" | 670 m || 
|-id=548 bgcolor=#fefefe
| 510548 ||  || — || February 11, 2008 || Mount Lemmon || Mount Lemmon Survey ||  || align=right data-sort-value="0.67" | 670 m || 
|-id=549 bgcolor=#fefefe
| 510549 ||  || — || May 20, 2012 || Mount Lemmon || Mount Lemmon Survey ||  || align=right data-sort-value="0.62" | 620 m || 
|-id=550 bgcolor=#fefefe
| 510550 ||  || — || April 27, 2012 || Haleakala || Pan-STARRS ||  || align=right data-sort-value="0.77" | 770 m || 
|-id=551 bgcolor=#E9E9E9
| 510551 ||  || — || May 21, 2012 || Mount Lemmon || Mount Lemmon Survey ||  || align=right | 1.9 km || 
|-id=552 bgcolor=#fefefe
| 510552 ||  || — || October 12, 2009 || Mount Lemmon || Mount Lemmon Survey ||  || align=right data-sort-value="0.71" | 710 m || 
|-id=553 bgcolor=#E9E9E9
| 510553 ||  || — || June 11, 2012 || Haleakala || Pan-STARRS ||  || align=right data-sort-value="0.91" | 910 m || 
|-id=554 bgcolor=#fefefe
| 510554 ||  || — || May 21, 2012 || Haleakala || Pan-STARRS || V || align=right data-sort-value="0.54" | 540 m || 
|-id=555 bgcolor=#E9E9E9
| 510555 ||  || — || April 23, 2012 || Mount Lemmon || Mount Lemmon Survey ||  || align=right | 1.5 km || 
|-id=556 bgcolor=#E9E9E9
| 510556 ||  || — || May 16, 2012 || Kitt Peak || Spacewatch ||  || align=right data-sort-value="0.94" | 940 m || 
|-id=557 bgcolor=#E9E9E9
| 510557 ||  || — || June 28, 2012 || Siding Spring || SSS ||  || align=right | 2.2 km || 
|-id=558 bgcolor=#fefefe
| 510558 ||  || — || March 13, 2008 || Kitt Peak || Spacewatch ||  || align=right data-sort-value="0.71" | 710 m || 
|-id=559 bgcolor=#E9E9E9
| 510559 ||  || — || August 8, 2012 || Haleakala || Pan-STARRS ||  || align=right | 1.5 km || 
|-id=560 bgcolor=#E9E9E9
| 510560 ||  || — || May 21, 2012 || Mount Lemmon || Mount Lemmon Survey ||  || align=right | 1.6 km || 
|-id=561 bgcolor=#fefefe
| 510561 ||  || — || August 8, 2012 || Haleakala || Pan-STARRS ||  || align=right data-sort-value="0.66" | 660 m || 
|-id=562 bgcolor=#E9E9E9
| 510562 ||  || — || March 13, 2011 || Kitt Peak || Spacewatch ||  || align=right | 1.7 km || 
|-id=563 bgcolor=#E9E9E9
| 510563 ||  || — || September 23, 2008 || Kitt Peak || Spacewatch ||  || align=right | 1.4 km || 
|-id=564 bgcolor=#C2FFFF
| 510564 ||  || — || August 13, 2012 || Haleakala || Pan-STARRS || L5 || align=right | 7.8 km || 
|-id=565 bgcolor=#E9E9E9
| 510565 ||  || — || August 12, 2012 || Haleakala || Pan-STARRS ||  || align=right | 1.7 km || 
|-id=566 bgcolor=#fefefe
| 510566 ||  || — || August 14, 2012 || Haleakala || Pan-STARRS ||  || align=right data-sort-value="0.86" | 860 m || 
|-id=567 bgcolor=#C2FFFF
| 510567 ||  || — || June 26, 2011 || Mount Lemmon || Mount Lemmon Survey || L5 || align=right | 10 km || 
|-id=568 bgcolor=#C2FFFF
| 510568 ||  || — || March 9, 2007 || Mount Lemmon || Mount Lemmon Survey || L5 || align=right | 9.2 km || 
|-id=569 bgcolor=#fefefe
| 510569 ||  || — || August 11, 2012 || Siding Spring || SSS ||  || align=right data-sort-value="0.85" | 850 m || 
|-id=570 bgcolor=#fefefe
| 510570 ||  || — || January 26, 2007 || Kitt Peak || Spacewatch ||  || align=right | 1.0 km || 
|-id=571 bgcolor=#E9E9E9
| 510571 ||  || — || May 7, 2007 || Kitt Peak || Spacewatch ||  || align=right | 1.3 km || 
|-id=572 bgcolor=#E9E9E9
| 510572 ||  || — || August 10, 2012 || Kitt Peak || Spacewatch ||  || align=right | 1.4 km || 
|-id=573 bgcolor=#C2FFFF
| 510573 ||  || — || August 24, 2012 || Kitt Peak || Spacewatch || L5 || align=right | 8.0 km || 
|-id=574 bgcolor=#E9E9E9
| 510574 ||  || — || August 26, 2012 || Haleakala || Pan-STARRS ||  || align=right | 1.2 km || 
|-id=575 bgcolor=#E9E9E9
| 510575 ||  || — || September 7, 2008 || Mount Lemmon || Mount Lemmon Survey || (1547) || align=right | 1.1 km || 
|-id=576 bgcolor=#E9E9E9
| 510576 ||  || — || May 31, 2011 || Mount Lemmon || Mount Lemmon Survey ||  || align=right | 1.3 km || 
|-id=577 bgcolor=#E9E9E9
| 510577 ||  || — || August 25, 1995 || Kitt Peak || Spacewatch || EUN || align=right data-sort-value="0.97" | 970 m || 
|-id=578 bgcolor=#E9E9E9
| 510578 ||  || — || September 15, 2012 || Catalina || CSS ||  || align=right | 2.2 km || 
|-id=579 bgcolor=#fefefe
| 510579 ||  || — || August 25, 2012 || Haleakala || Pan-STARRS ||  || align=right data-sort-value="0.93" | 930 m || 
|-id=580 bgcolor=#E9E9E9
| 510580 ||  || — || September 15, 2012 || Catalina || CSS ||  || align=right | 1.7 km || 
|-id=581 bgcolor=#E9E9E9
| 510581 ||  || — || March 31, 2011 || Haleakala || Pan-STARRS ||  || align=right | 1.6 km || 
|-id=582 bgcolor=#E9E9E9
| 510582 ||  || — || October 31, 2008 || Mount Lemmon || Mount Lemmon Survey ||  || align=right | 1.3 km || 
|-id=583 bgcolor=#E9E9E9
| 510583 ||  || — || October 13, 1999 || Kitt Peak || Spacewatch ||  || align=right | 1.1 km || 
|-id=584 bgcolor=#E9E9E9
| 510584 ||  || — || August 26, 2012 || Haleakala || Pan-STARRS || EUN || align=right data-sort-value="0.95" | 950 m || 
|-id=585 bgcolor=#fefefe
| 510585 ||  || — || August 14, 2012 || Haleakala || Pan-STARRS ||  || align=right data-sort-value="0.67" | 670 m || 
|-id=586 bgcolor=#E9E9E9
| 510586 ||  || — || September 27, 2003 || Kitt Peak || Spacewatch ||  || align=right | 1.8 km || 
|-id=587 bgcolor=#E9E9E9
| 510587 ||  || — || September 17, 2012 || Kitt Peak || Spacewatch || MRX || align=right data-sort-value="0.99" | 990 m || 
|-id=588 bgcolor=#E9E9E9
| 510588 ||  || — || September 24, 2008 || Mount Lemmon || Mount Lemmon Survey ||  || align=right data-sort-value="0.85" | 850 m || 
|-id=589 bgcolor=#E9E9E9
| 510589 ||  || — || September 21, 2008 || Mount Lemmon || Mount Lemmon Survey ||  || align=right data-sort-value="0.94" | 940 m || 
|-id=590 bgcolor=#E9E9E9
| 510590 ||  || — || September 17, 2012 || Mount Lemmon || Mount Lemmon Survey || AGN || align=right | 1.1 km || 
|-id=591 bgcolor=#C2FFFF
| 510591 ||  || — || August 21, 2011 || Haleakala || Pan-STARRS || L5 || align=right | 7.2 km || 
|-id=592 bgcolor=#E9E9E9
| 510592 ||  || — || January 31, 1997 || Kitt Peak || Spacewatch ||  || align=right | 1.2 km || 
|-id=593 bgcolor=#E9E9E9
| 510593 ||  || — || September 23, 2008 || Kitt Peak || Spacewatch ||  || align=right data-sort-value="0.88" | 880 m || 
|-id=594 bgcolor=#E9E9E9
| 510594 ||  || — || September 15, 2012 || Kitt Peak || Spacewatch ||  || align=right | 1.4 km || 
|-id=595 bgcolor=#E9E9E9
| 510595 ||  || — || July 3, 2003 || Kitt Peak || Spacewatch ||  || align=right | 1.5 km || 
|-id=596 bgcolor=#E9E9E9
| 510596 ||  || — || December 6, 2008 || Mount Lemmon || Mount Lemmon Survey || JUN || align=right data-sort-value="0.98" | 980 m || 
|-id=597 bgcolor=#E9E9E9
| 510597 ||  || — || September 21, 2012 || Kitt Peak || Spacewatch ||  || align=right | 2.0 km || 
|-id=598 bgcolor=#E9E9E9
| 510598 ||  || — || August 13, 2012 || Kitt Peak || Spacewatch ||  || align=right | 1.3 km || 
|-id=599 bgcolor=#E9E9E9
| 510599 ||  || — || May 24, 2011 || Haleakala || Pan-STARRS ||  || align=right | 1.3 km || 
|-id=600 bgcolor=#FA8072
| 510600 ||  || — || September 18, 2012 || Kitt Peak || Spacewatch || H || align=right data-sort-value="0.66" | 660 m || 
|}

510601–510700 

|-bgcolor=#E9E9E9
| 510601 ||  || — || October 6, 2012 || Mount Lemmon || Mount Lemmon Survey ||  || align=right | 2.0 km || 
|-id=602 bgcolor=#E9E9E9
| 510602 ||  || — || October 6, 2012 || Haleakala || Pan-STARRS || ADE || align=right | 1.6 km || 
|-id=603 bgcolor=#E9E9E9
| 510603 ||  || — || November 2, 2008 || Mount Lemmon || Mount Lemmon Survey ||  || align=right | 1.3 km || 
|-id=604 bgcolor=#E9E9E9
| 510604 ||  || — || October 3, 2003 || Kitt Peak || Spacewatch || WIT || align=right | 1.1 km || 
|-id=605 bgcolor=#E9E9E9
| 510605 ||  || — || August 25, 2012 || Haleakala || Pan-STARRS ||  || align=right | 1.9 km || 
|-id=606 bgcolor=#E9E9E9
| 510606 ||  || — || December 17, 2003 || Socorro || LINEAR ||  || align=right | 2.1 km || 
|-id=607 bgcolor=#fefefe
| 510607 ||  || — || September 30, 2005 || Mount Lemmon || Mount Lemmon Survey ||  || align=right data-sort-value="0.86" | 860 m || 
|-id=608 bgcolor=#C2FFFF
| 510608 ||  || — || October 8, 2012 || Mount Lemmon || Mount Lemmon Survey || L5 || align=right | 9.4 km || 
|-id=609 bgcolor=#E9E9E9
| 510609 ||  || — || December 29, 2008 || Kitt Peak || Spacewatch ||  || align=right | 1.7 km || 
|-id=610 bgcolor=#E9E9E9
| 510610 ||  || — || January 1, 2009 || Kitt Peak || Spacewatch || DOR || align=right | 1.8 km || 
|-id=611 bgcolor=#E9E9E9
| 510611 ||  || — || October 6, 2012 || Mount Lemmon || Mount Lemmon Survey || AGN || align=right data-sort-value="0.90" | 900 m || 
|-id=612 bgcolor=#E9E9E9
| 510612 ||  || — || October 8, 2012 || Kitt Peak || Spacewatch ||  || align=right | 1.5 km || 
|-id=613 bgcolor=#E9E9E9
| 510613 ||  || — || August 10, 2007 || Kitt Peak || Spacewatch ||  || align=right | 1.7 km || 
|-id=614 bgcolor=#E9E9E9
| 510614 ||  || — || November 21, 2008 || Kitt Peak || Spacewatch ||  || align=right | 1.2 km || 
|-id=615 bgcolor=#E9E9E9
| 510615 ||  || — || October 9, 2008 || Kitt Peak || Spacewatch ||  || align=right | 2.3 km || 
|-id=616 bgcolor=#E9E9E9
| 510616 ||  || — || October 9, 2008 || Kitt Peak || Spacewatch ||  || align=right data-sort-value="0.84" | 840 m || 
|-id=617 bgcolor=#E9E9E9
| 510617 ||  || — || December 29, 2005 || Kitt Peak || Spacewatch ||  || align=right data-sort-value="0.89" | 890 m || 
|-id=618 bgcolor=#E9E9E9
| 510618 ||  || — || August 12, 2012 || Kitt Peak || Spacewatch ||  || align=right | 1.4 km || 
|-id=619 bgcolor=#C2FFFF
| 510619 ||  || — || October 6, 2012 || Haleakala || Pan-STARRS || L5 || align=right | 8.7 km || 
|-id=620 bgcolor=#E9E9E9
| 510620 ||  || — || September 15, 2012 || Kitt Peak || Spacewatch ||  || align=right | 1.4 km || 
|-id=621 bgcolor=#E9E9E9
| 510621 ||  || — || November 7, 2008 || Mount Lemmon || Mount Lemmon Survey ||  || align=right | 1.1 km || 
|-id=622 bgcolor=#E9E9E9
| 510622 ||  || — || September 22, 2012 || Kitt Peak || Spacewatch || MRX || align=right data-sort-value="0.79" | 790 m || 
|-id=623 bgcolor=#E9E9E9
| 510623 ||  || — || October 8, 2012 || Mount Lemmon || Mount Lemmon Survey || AST || align=right | 1.5 km || 
|-id=624 bgcolor=#d6d6d6
| 510624 ||  || — || September 10, 2007 || Kitt Peak || Spacewatch ||  || align=right | 1.8 km || 
|-id=625 bgcolor=#C2FFFF
| 510625 ||  || — || September 17, 2012 || Kitt Peak || Spacewatch || L5 || align=right | 7.0 km || 
|-id=626 bgcolor=#E9E9E9
| 510626 ||  || — || October 8, 2012 || Haleakala || Pan-STARRS || NEM || align=right | 2.3 km || 
|-id=627 bgcolor=#E9E9E9
| 510627 ||  || — || September 19, 2012 || Mount Lemmon || Mount Lemmon Survey ||  || align=right | 1.2 km || 
|-id=628 bgcolor=#fefefe
| 510628 ||  || — || September 25, 2012 || Catalina || CSS ||  || align=right data-sort-value="0.83" | 830 m || 
|-id=629 bgcolor=#E9E9E9
| 510629 ||  || — || January 18, 2005 || Kitt Peak || Spacewatch ||  || align=right | 1.1 km || 
|-id=630 bgcolor=#E9E9E9
| 510630 ||  || — || September 16, 2003 || Kitt Peak || Spacewatch ||  || align=right | 1.5 km || 
|-id=631 bgcolor=#E9E9E9
| 510631 ||  || — || October 23, 2008 || Mount Lemmon || Mount Lemmon Survey ||  || align=right data-sort-value="0.71" | 710 m || 
|-id=632 bgcolor=#C2FFFF
| 510632 ||  || — || October 8, 2012 || Mount Lemmon || Mount Lemmon Survey || L5 || align=right | 6.1 km || 
|-id=633 bgcolor=#E9E9E9
| 510633 ||  || — || October 10, 2012 || Kitt Peak || Spacewatch ||  || align=right | 1.2 km || 
|-id=634 bgcolor=#E9E9E9
| 510634 ||  || — || November 18, 2008 || Catalina || CSS ||  || align=right | 1.1 km || 
|-id=635 bgcolor=#E9E9E9
| 510635 ||  || — || October 17, 2003 || Kitt Peak || Spacewatch ||  || align=right | 1.4 km || 
|-id=636 bgcolor=#E9E9E9
| 510636 ||  || — || May 30, 2011 || Haleakala || Pan-STARRS ||  || align=right | 2.0 km || 
|-id=637 bgcolor=#E9E9E9
| 510637 ||  || — || October 11, 2012 || Kitt Peak || Spacewatch ||  || align=right | 1.5 km || 
|-id=638 bgcolor=#fefefe
| 510638 ||  || — || November 17, 2009 || Kitt Peak || Spacewatch ||  || align=right data-sort-value="0.52" | 520 m || 
|-id=639 bgcolor=#E9E9E9
| 510639 ||  || — || November 8, 2008 || Kitt Peak || Spacewatch ||  || align=right | 1.3 km || 
|-id=640 bgcolor=#E9E9E9
| 510640 ||  || — || October 11, 2012 || Haleakala || Pan-STARRS ||  || align=right | 2.6 km || 
|-id=641 bgcolor=#E9E9E9
| 510641 ||  || — || September 14, 2012 || Mount Lemmon || Mount Lemmon Survey ||  || align=right | 1.7 km || 
|-id=642 bgcolor=#E9E9E9
| 510642 ||  || — || September 19, 2012 || Mount Lemmon || Mount Lemmon Survey ||  || align=right | 1.6 km || 
|-id=643 bgcolor=#E9E9E9
| 510643 ||  || — || October 14, 2012 || Catalina || CSS ||  || align=right | 2.5 km || 
|-id=644 bgcolor=#FA8072
| 510644 ||  || — || October 8, 2012 || Haleakala || Pan-STARRS || H || align=right data-sort-value="0.54" | 540 m || 
|-id=645 bgcolor=#E9E9E9
| 510645 ||  || — || October 29, 2008 || Kitt Peak || Spacewatch ||  || align=right data-sort-value="0.89" | 890 m || 
|-id=646 bgcolor=#E9E9E9
| 510646 ||  || — || October 20, 2008 || Kitt Peak || Spacewatch ||  || align=right | 1.1 km || 
|-id=647 bgcolor=#E9E9E9
| 510647 ||  || — || October 6, 2012 || Haleakala || Pan-STARRS ||  || align=right | 1.1 km || 
|-id=648 bgcolor=#E9E9E9
| 510648 ||  || — || September 21, 2012 || Catalina || CSS ||  || align=right | 2.1 km || 
|-id=649 bgcolor=#E9E9E9
| 510649 ||  || — || October 7, 2012 || Haleakala || Pan-STARRS ||  || align=right | 1.4 km || 
|-id=650 bgcolor=#d6d6d6
| 510650 ||  || — || February 3, 2009 || Mount Lemmon || Mount Lemmon Survey ||  || align=right | 3.2 km || 
|-id=651 bgcolor=#E9E9E9
| 510651 ||  || — || October 8, 2012 || Kitt Peak || Spacewatch ||  || align=right | 2.0 km || 
|-id=652 bgcolor=#E9E9E9
| 510652 ||  || — || October 8, 2012 || Haleakala || Pan-STARRS ||  || align=right | 1.2 km || 
|-id=653 bgcolor=#d6d6d6
| 510653 ||  || — || October 18, 2007 || Kitt Peak || Spacewatch || KOR || align=right | 1.1 km || 
|-id=654 bgcolor=#E9E9E9
| 510654 ||  || — || October 7, 2012 || Haleakala || Pan-STARRS ||  || align=right | 1.9 km || 
|-id=655 bgcolor=#d6d6d6
| 510655 ||  || — || September 15, 2012 || Mount Lemmon || Mount Lemmon Survey ||  || align=right | 2.7 km || 
|-id=656 bgcolor=#E9E9E9
| 510656 ||  || — || October 10, 2012 || Haleakala || Pan-STARRS || EUN || align=right | 1.0 km || 
|-id=657 bgcolor=#E9E9E9
| 510657 ||  || — || October 11, 2012 || Mount Lemmon || Mount Lemmon Survey ||  || align=right | 1.1 km || 
|-id=658 bgcolor=#fefefe
| 510658 ||  || — || October 8, 2012 || Haleakala || Pan-STARRS ||  || align=right data-sort-value="0.98" | 980 m || 
|-id=659 bgcolor=#E9E9E9
| 510659 ||  || — || October 8, 2012 || Haleakala || Pan-STARRS ||  || align=right | 2.0 km || 
|-id=660 bgcolor=#d6d6d6
| 510660 ||  || — || December 22, 2008 || Kitt Peak || Spacewatch ||  || align=right | 1.9 km || 
|-id=661 bgcolor=#E9E9E9
| 510661 ||  || — || August 28, 2012 || Mount Lemmon || Mount Lemmon Survey ||  || align=right | 1.2 km || 
|-id=662 bgcolor=#E9E9E9
| 510662 ||  || — || December 2, 2008 || Kitt Peak || Spacewatch || TIN || align=right | 1.3 km || 
|-id=663 bgcolor=#E9E9E9
| 510663 ||  || — || October 9, 2012 || Haleakala || Pan-STARRS ||  || align=right | 1.2 km || 
|-id=664 bgcolor=#E9E9E9
| 510664 ||  || — || October 10, 2012 || Haleakala || Pan-STARRS ||  || align=right | 1.6 km || 
|-id=665 bgcolor=#E9E9E9
| 510665 ||  || — || September 16, 2012 || Kitt Peak || Spacewatch ||  || align=right | 1.4 km || 
|-id=666 bgcolor=#E9E9E9
| 510666 ||  || — || September 23, 2012 || La Sagra || OAM Obs. || MAR || align=right | 1.4 km || 
|-id=667 bgcolor=#E9E9E9
| 510667 ||  || — || August 14, 2012 || Siding Spring || SSS ||  || align=right | 1.7 km || 
|-id=668 bgcolor=#E9E9E9
| 510668 ||  || — || September 18, 2012 || Kitt Peak || Spacewatch ||  || align=right | 2.1 km || 
|-id=669 bgcolor=#E9E9E9
| 510669 ||  || — || October 7, 2012 || Haleakala || Pan-STARRS ||  || align=right | 1.8 km || 
|-id=670 bgcolor=#E9E9E9
| 510670 ||  || — || November 1, 2008 || Mount Lemmon || Mount Lemmon Survey ||  || align=right | 1.1 km || 
|-id=671 bgcolor=#E9E9E9
| 510671 ||  || — || October 8, 2012 || Haleakala || Pan-STARRS ||  || align=right data-sort-value="0.68" | 680 m || 
|-id=672 bgcolor=#E9E9E9
| 510672 ||  || — || September 12, 2007 || Mount Lemmon || Mount Lemmon Survey ||  || align=right | 1.7 km || 
|-id=673 bgcolor=#E9E9E9
| 510673 ||  || — || October 1, 2003 || Kitt Peak || Spacewatch ||  || align=right | 1.3 km || 
|-id=674 bgcolor=#E9E9E9
| 510674 ||  || — || October 18, 2003 || Kitt Peak || Spacewatch ||  || align=right | 1.5 km || 
|-id=675 bgcolor=#E9E9E9
| 510675 ||  || — || October 17, 2012 || Kitt Peak || Spacewatch ||  || align=right | 1.6 km || 
|-id=676 bgcolor=#E9E9E9
| 510676 ||  || — || October 17, 2012 || Kitt Peak || Spacewatch ||  || align=right | 1.8 km || 
|-id=677 bgcolor=#E9E9E9
| 510677 ||  || — || October 17, 2012 || Mount Lemmon || Mount Lemmon Survey ||  || align=right | 1.3 km || 
|-id=678 bgcolor=#E9E9E9
| 510678 ||  || — || October 18, 2012 || Haleakala || Pan-STARRS ||  || align=right | 1.9 km || 
|-id=679 bgcolor=#E9E9E9
| 510679 ||  || — || November 24, 2008 || Kitt Peak || Spacewatch ||  || align=right | 1.3 km || 
|-id=680 bgcolor=#E9E9E9
| 510680 ||  || — || October 8, 2012 || Kitt Peak || Spacewatch ||  || align=right | 1.8 km || 
|-id=681 bgcolor=#E9E9E9
| 510681 ||  || — || November 30, 2008 || Mount Lemmon || Mount Lemmon Survey ||  || align=right | 1.2 km || 
|-id=682 bgcolor=#E9E9E9
| 510682 ||  || — || October 22, 2003 || Kitt Peak || Spacewatch ||  || align=right | 2.0 km || 
|-id=683 bgcolor=#E9E9E9
| 510683 ||  || — || October 19, 2012 || Haleakala || Pan-STARRS || AEO || align=right | 1.1 km || 
|-id=684 bgcolor=#E9E9E9
| 510684 ||  || — || November 21, 2003 || Kitt Peak || Spacewatch ||  || align=right | 1.4 km || 
|-id=685 bgcolor=#E9E9E9
| 510685 ||  || — || October 20, 2012 || Haleakala || Pan-STARRS ||  || align=right | 1.7 km || 
|-id=686 bgcolor=#E9E9E9
| 510686 ||  || — || October 21, 2012 || Haleakala || Pan-STARRS ||  || align=right | 1.2 km || 
|-id=687 bgcolor=#E9E9E9
| 510687 ||  || — || September 21, 2012 || Mount Lemmon || Mount Lemmon Survey ||  || align=right | 1.5 km || 
|-id=688 bgcolor=#E9E9E9
| 510688 ||  || — || July 26, 2011 || Haleakala || Pan-STARRS || HOF || align=right | 2.8 km || 
|-id=689 bgcolor=#E9E9E9
| 510689 ||  || — || September 22, 2008 || Kitt Peak || Spacewatch ||  || align=right data-sort-value="0.90" | 900 m || 
|-id=690 bgcolor=#E9E9E9
| 510690 ||  || — || October 22, 2012 || Haleakala || Pan-STARRS ||  || align=right | 1.1 km || 
|-id=691 bgcolor=#E9E9E9
| 510691 ||  || — || October 22, 2012 || Haleakala || Pan-STARRS ||  || align=right | 1.7 km || 
|-id=692 bgcolor=#E9E9E9
| 510692 ||  || — || October 22, 2012 || Haleakala || Pan-STARRS ||  || align=right | 1.6 km || 
|-id=693 bgcolor=#E9E9E9
| 510693 ||  || — || September 19, 2003 || Kitt Peak || Spacewatch ||  || align=right | 1.1 km || 
|-id=694 bgcolor=#E9E9E9
| 510694 ||  || — || October 25, 2003 || Socorro || LINEAR ||  || align=right | 1.8 km || 
|-id=695 bgcolor=#E9E9E9
| 510695 ||  || — || October 10, 2012 || Haleakala || Pan-STARRS ||  || align=right | 1.5 km || 
|-id=696 bgcolor=#E9E9E9
| 510696 ||  || — || September 22, 2012 || Kitt Peak || Spacewatch ||  || align=right | 1.3 km || 
|-id=697 bgcolor=#E9E9E9
| 510697 ||  || — || January 16, 2009 || Mount Lemmon || Mount Lemmon Survey ||  || align=right | 1.7 km || 
|-id=698 bgcolor=#E9E9E9
| 510698 ||  || — || October 15, 2012 || Kitt Peak || Spacewatch ||  || align=right | 1.4 km || 
|-id=699 bgcolor=#E9E9E9
| 510699 ||  || — || December 2, 2008 || Kitt Peak || Spacewatch ||  || align=right | 1.4 km || 
|-id=700 bgcolor=#E9E9E9
| 510700 ||  || — || October 21, 2012 || Kitt Peak || Spacewatch ||  || align=right | 1.4 km || 
|}

510701–510800 

|-bgcolor=#E9E9E9
| 510701 ||  || — || October 21, 2012 || Haleakala || Pan-STARRS ||  || align=right | 1.4 km || 
|-id=702 bgcolor=#E9E9E9
| 510702 ||  || — || October 21, 2012 || Haleakala || Pan-STARRS ||  || align=right | 1.5 km || 
|-id=703 bgcolor=#E9E9E9
| 510703 ||  || — || October 10, 2012 || Haleakala || Pan-STARRS || EUN || align=right | 1.1 km || 
|-id=704 bgcolor=#E9E9E9
| 510704 ||  || — || December 14, 2004 || Campo Imperatore || CINEOS || EUN || align=right | 1.5 km || 
|-id=705 bgcolor=#E9E9E9
| 510705 ||  || — || December 19, 2003 || Socorro || LINEAR ||  || align=right | 2.2 km || 
|-id=706 bgcolor=#E9E9E9
| 510706 ||  || — || October 21, 2012 || Kitt Peak || Spacewatch ||  || align=right | 1.6 km || 
|-id=707 bgcolor=#E9E9E9
| 510707 ||  || — || October 18, 2012 || Haleakala || Pan-STARRS ||  || align=right | 1.2 km || 
|-id=708 bgcolor=#E9E9E9
| 510708 ||  || — || October 22, 2012 || Mount Lemmon || Mount Lemmon Survey ||  || align=right data-sort-value="0.81" | 810 m || 
|-id=709 bgcolor=#E9E9E9
| 510709 ||  || — || October 6, 2012 || Haleakala || Pan-STARRS ||  || align=right | 2.5 km || 
|-id=710 bgcolor=#E9E9E9
| 510710 ||  || — || October 30, 2008 || Kitt Peak || Spacewatch || EUN || align=right | 1.1 km || 
|-id=711 bgcolor=#E9E9E9
| 510711 ||  || — || September 15, 2012 || Kitt Peak || Spacewatch ||  || align=right | 1.2 km || 
|-id=712 bgcolor=#E9E9E9
| 510712 ||  || — || October 15, 2012 || Mount Lemmon || Mount Lemmon Survey ||  || align=right | 1.2 km || 
|-id=713 bgcolor=#E9E9E9
| 510713 ||  || — || April 9, 2006 || Mount Lemmon || Mount Lemmon Survey ||  || align=right data-sort-value="0.94" | 940 m || 
|-id=714 bgcolor=#E9E9E9
| 510714 ||  || — || October 8, 2012 || Kitt Peak || Spacewatch ||  || align=right | 1.0 km || 
|-id=715 bgcolor=#E9E9E9
| 510715 ||  || — || September 3, 2007 || Mount Lemmon || Mount Lemmon Survey ||  || align=right | 2.2 km || 
|-id=716 bgcolor=#fefefe
| 510716 ||  || — || November 6, 2012 || Haleakala || Pan-STARRS || H || align=right data-sort-value="0.62" | 620 m || 
|-id=717 bgcolor=#E9E9E9
| 510717 ||  || — || October 21, 2012 || Haleakala || Pan-STARRS ||  || align=right | 2.7 km || 
|-id=718 bgcolor=#E9E9E9
| 510718 ||  || — || October 17, 2012 || Haleakala || Pan-STARRS ||  || align=right | 1.8 km || 
|-id=719 bgcolor=#E9E9E9
| 510719 ||  || — || December 31, 2008 || Catalina || CSS ||  || align=right | 1.7 km || 
|-id=720 bgcolor=#E9E9E9
| 510720 ||  || — || July 25, 2011 || Haleakala || Pan-STARRS ||  || align=right | 1.8 km || 
|-id=721 bgcolor=#E9E9E9
| 510721 ||  || — || October 18, 2012 || Haleakala || Pan-STARRS ||  || align=right | 1.8 km || 
|-id=722 bgcolor=#E9E9E9
| 510722 ||  || — || April 9, 2010 || Kitt Peak || Spacewatch ||  || align=right | 1.2 km || 
|-id=723 bgcolor=#E9E9E9
| 510723 ||  || — || November 16, 1999 || Kitt Peak || Spacewatch ||  || align=right | 1.3 km || 
|-id=724 bgcolor=#E9E9E9
| 510724 ||  || — || October 21, 2012 || Haleakala || Pan-STARRS ||  || align=right | 1.4 km || 
|-id=725 bgcolor=#E9E9E9
| 510725 ||  || — || September 19, 2012 || Mount Lemmon || Mount Lemmon Survey ||  || align=right | 1.2 km || 
|-id=726 bgcolor=#d6d6d6
| 510726 ||  || — || November 7, 2012 || Kitt Peak || Spacewatch ||  || align=right | 3.2 km || 
|-id=727 bgcolor=#d6d6d6
| 510727 ||  || — || November 18, 2007 || Mount Lemmon || Mount Lemmon Survey ||  || align=right | 1.9 km || 
|-id=728 bgcolor=#E9E9E9
| 510728 ||  || — || May 26, 2011 || Mount Lemmon || Mount Lemmon Survey ||  || align=right | 2.6 km || 
|-id=729 bgcolor=#E9E9E9
| 510729 ||  || — || October 16, 2012 || Kitt Peak || Spacewatch ||  || align=right | 1.3 km || 
|-id=730 bgcolor=#E9E9E9
| 510730 ||  || — || October 15, 2012 || Kitt Peak || Spacewatch ||  || align=right | 2.1 km || 
|-id=731 bgcolor=#E9E9E9
| 510731 ||  || — || October 6, 2012 || Haleakala || Pan-STARRS || ADE || align=right | 1.9 km || 
|-id=732 bgcolor=#d6d6d6
| 510732 ||  || — || October 9, 2012 || Mount Lemmon || Mount Lemmon Survey ||  || align=right | 2.7 km || 
|-id=733 bgcolor=#fefefe
| 510733 ||  || — || November 13, 2012 || Kitt Peak || Spacewatch || H || align=right data-sort-value="0.64" | 640 m || 
|-id=734 bgcolor=#E9E9E9
| 510734 ||  || — || October 27, 2003 || Kitt Peak || Spacewatch || GAL || align=right | 1.4 km || 
|-id=735 bgcolor=#d6d6d6
| 510735 ||  || — || October 10, 2007 || Kitt Peak || Spacewatch ||  || align=right | 2.1 km || 
|-id=736 bgcolor=#C2FFFF
| 510736 ||  || — || November 1, 2014 || Mount Lemmon || Mount Lemmon Survey || L5 || align=right | 9.6 km || 
|-id=737 bgcolor=#d6d6d6
| 510737 ||  || — || December 4, 2007 || Kitt Peak || Spacewatch ||  || align=right | 2.5 km || 
|-id=738 bgcolor=#E9E9E9
| 510738 ||  || — || October 20, 2012 || Kitt Peak || Spacewatch ||  || align=right | 1.2 km || 
|-id=739 bgcolor=#d6d6d6
| 510739 ||  || — || November 7, 2007 || Kitt Peak || Spacewatch ||  || align=right | 2.1 km || 
|-id=740 bgcolor=#E9E9E9
| 510740 ||  || — || November 19, 2012 || Kitt Peak || Spacewatch ||  || align=right | 1.5 km || 
|-id=741 bgcolor=#E9E9E9
| 510741 ||  || — || October 9, 2007 || Mount Lemmon || Mount Lemmon Survey ||  || align=right | 1.5 km || 
|-id=742 bgcolor=#E9E9E9
| 510742 ||  || — || November 6, 2012 || Kitt Peak || Spacewatch ||  || align=right | 1.2 km || 
|-id=743 bgcolor=#E9E9E9
| 510743 ||  || — || September 25, 2012 || Mount Lemmon || Mount Lemmon Survey ||  || align=right | 1.8 km || 
|-id=744 bgcolor=#d6d6d6
| 510744 ||  || — || November 12, 2012 || Mount Lemmon || Mount Lemmon Survey ||  || align=right | 2.5 km || 
|-id=745 bgcolor=#E9E9E9
| 510745 ||  || — || January 18, 2009 || Kitt Peak || Spacewatch ||  || align=right | 1.4 km || 
|-id=746 bgcolor=#d6d6d6
| 510746 ||  || — || June 10, 2011 || Mount Lemmon || Mount Lemmon Survey ||  || align=right | 2.9 km || 
|-id=747 bgcolor=#E9E9E9
| 510747 ||  || — || November 12, 2012 || Mount Lemmon || Mount Lemmon Survey ||  || align=right | 2.4 km || 
|-id=748 bgcolor=#E9E9E9
| 510748 ||  || — || November 4, 2012 || Kitt Peak || Spacewatch ||  || align=right | 3.0 km || 
|-id=749 bgcolor=#d6d6d6
| 510749 ||  || — || November 26, 2012 || Mount Lemmon || Mount Lemmon Survey ||  || align=right | 2.4 km || 
|-id=750 bgcolor=#E9E9E9
| 510750 ||  || — || October 21, 2012 || Haleakala || Pan-STARRS ||  || align=right | 1.3 km || 
|-id=751 bgcolor=#E9E9E9
| 510751 ||  || — || December 22, 2008 || Kitt Peak || Spacewatch ||  || align=right | 1.3 km || 
|-id=752 bgcolor=#FA8072
| 510752 ||  || — || December 10, 2012 || Haleakala || Pan-STARRS || H || align=right data-sort-value="0.58" | 580 m || 
|-id=753 bgcolor=#E9E9E9
| 510753 ||  || — || November 14, 2012 || Mount Lemmon || Mount Lemmon Survey ||  || align=right | 2.6 km || 
|-id=754 bgcolor=#E9E9E9
| 510754 ||  || — || December 4, 2012 || Mount Lemmon || Mount Lemmon Survey ||  || align=right | 1.8 km || 
|-id=755 bgcolor=#fefefe
| 510755 ||  || — || November 13, 2012 || Mount Lemmon || Mount Lemmon Survey || H || align=right data-sort-value="0.73" | 730 m || 
|-id=756 bgcolor=#d6d6d6
| 510756 ||  || — || February 3, 2008 || Mount Lemmon || Mount Lemmon Survey ||  || align=right | 2.8 km || 
|-id=757 bgcolor=#E9E9E9
| 510757 ||  || — || October 20, 2012 || Kitt Peak || Spacewatch ||  || align=right | 1.6 km || 
|-id=758 bgcolor=#d6d6d6
| 510758 ||  || — || September 28, 2006 || Catalina || CSS ||  || align=right | 2.8 km || 
|-id=759 bgcolor=#E9E9E9
| 510759 ||  || — || October 23, 2012 || Mount Lemmon || Mount Lemmon Survey ||  || align=right | 1.9 km || 
|-id=760 bgcolor=#E9E9E9
| 510760 ||  || — || September 25, 2011 || Haleakala || Pan-STARRS ||  || align=right | 1.5 km || 
|-id=761 bgcolor=#E9E9E9
| 510761 ||  || — || October 8, 2007 || Catalina || CSS ||  || align=right | 2.1 km || 
|-id=762 bgcolor=#fefefe
| 510762 ||  || — || December 27, 2012 || Haleakala || Pan-STARRS || H || align=right data-sort-value="0.75" | 750 m || 
|-id=763 bgcolor=#E9E9E9
| 510763 ||  || — || March 3, 2010 || WISE || WISE ||  || align=right | 2.5 km || 
|-id=764 bgcolor=#d6d6d6
| 510764 ||  || — || September 26, 2006 || Kitt Peak || Spacewatch ||  || align=right | 1.8 km || 
|-id=765 bgcolor=#fefefe
| 510765 ||  || — || November 12, 2007 || Mount Lemmon || Mount Lemmon Survey || H || align=right data-sort-value="0.76" | 760 m || 
|-id=766 bgcolor=#d6d6d6
| 510766 ||  || — || May 18, 2010 || WISE || WISE || Tj (2.98) || align=right | 4.3 km || 
|-id=767 bgcolor=#d6d6d6
| 510767 ||  || — || January 5, 2013 || Mount Lemmon || Mount Lemmon Survey ||  || align=right | 2.7 km || 
|-id=768 bgcolor=#E9E9E9
| 510768 ||  || — || November 6, 2012 || Kitt Peak || Spacewatch || MRX || align=right data-sort-value="0.84" | 840 m || 
|-id=769 bgcolor=#E9E9E9
| 510769 ||  || — || September 5, 2010 || Mount Lemmon || Mount Lemmon Survey ||  || align=right | 2.5 km || 
|-id=770 bgcolor=#d6d6d6
| 510770 ||  || — || January 5, 2013 || Kitt Peak || Spacewatch ||  || align=right | 3.4 km || 
|-id=771 bgcolor=#d6d6d6
| 510771 ||  || — || October 19, 2006 || Kitt Peak || Spacewatch ||  || align=right | 2.3 km || 
|-id=772 bgcolor=#d6d6d6
| 510772 ||  || — || October 24, 2011 || Haleakala || Pan-STARRS || VER || align=right | 3.3 km || 
|-id=773 bgcolor=#E9E9E9
| 510773 ||  || — || December 30, 2008 || Mount Lemmon || Mount Lemmon Survey ||  || align=right | 1.7 km || 
|-id=774 bgcolor=#fefefe
| 510774 ||  || — || January 8, 2013 || Haleakala || Pan-STARRS || H || align=right data-sort-value="0.69" | 690 m || 
|-id=775 bgcolor=#d6d6d6
| 510775 ||  || — || November 12, 2012 || Mount Lemmon || Mount Lemmon Survey ||  || align=right | 2.5 km || 
|-id=776 bgcolor=#d6d6d6
| 510776 ||  || — || December 9, 2012 || Mount Lemmon || Mount Lemmon Survey ||  || align=right | 2.5 km || 
|-id=777 bgcolor=#E9E9E9
| 510777 ||  || — || October 25, 2011 || Haleakala || Pan-STARRS ||  || align=right | 2.5 km || 
|-id=778 bgcolor=#d6d6d6
| 510778 ||  || — || September 19, 2011 || Haleakala || Pan-STARRS ||  || align=right | 2.6 km || 
|-id=779 bgcolor=#fefefe
| 510779 ||  || — || January 10, 2013 || Haleakala || Pan-STARRS || H || align=right data-sort-value="0.56" | 560 m || 
|-id=780 bgcolor=#fefefe
| 510780 ||  || — || January 11, 2013 || Haleakala || Pan-STARRS || H || align=right data-sort-value="0.74" | 740 m || 
|-id=781 bgcolor=#E9E9E9
| 510781 ||  || — || October 5, 2002 || Socorro || LINEAR ||  || align=right | 2.0 km || 
|-id=782 bgcolor=#d6d6d6
| 510782 ||  || — || December 22, 2012 || Haleakala || Pan-STARRS ||  || align=right | 2.4 km || 
|-id=783 bgcolor=#fefefe
| 510783 ||  || — || April 28, 2011 || Haleakala || Pan-STARRS || H || align=right data-sort-value="0.73" | 730 m || 
|-id=784 bgcolor=#fefefe
| 510784 ||  || — || January 16, 2005 || Socorro || LINEAR || H || align=right data-sort-value="0.69" | 690 m || 
|-id=785 bgcolor=#d6d6d6
| 510785 ||  || — || January 9, 2013 || Kitt Peak || Spacewatch ||  || align=right | 2.6 km || 
|-id=786 bgcolor=#d6d6d6
| 510786 ||  || — || December 23, 2012 || Haleakala || Pan-STARRS ||  || align=right | 2.8 km || 
|-id=787 bgcolor=#d6d6d6
| 510787 ||  || — || August 24, 2011 || Haleakala || Pan-STARRS ||  || align=right | 2.9 km || 
|-id=788 bgcolor=#fefefe
| 510788 ||  || — || December 9, 2012 || Kitt Peak || Spacewatch || H || align=right data-sort-value="0.49" | 490 m || 
|-id=789 bgcolor=#d6d6d6
| 510789 ||  || — || October 19, 2011 || Haleakala || Pan-STARRS ||  || align=right | 2.6 km || 
|-id=790 bgcolor=#d6d6d6
| 510790 ||  || — || September 23, 2011 || Haleakala || Pan-STARRS ||  || align=right | 2.1 km || 
|-id=791 bgcolor=#fefefe
| 510791 ||  || — || January 6, 2013 || Mount Lemmon || Mount Lemmon Survey || H || align=right data-sort-value="0.60" | 600 m || 
|-id=792 bgcolor=#fefefe
| 510792 ||  || — || January 5, 2013 || Catalina || CSS || H || align=right data-sort-value="0.81" | 810 m || 
|-id=793 bgcolor=#C2FFFF
| 510793 ||  || — || August 24, 2008 || Kitt Peak || Spacewatch || L4 || align=right | 9.3 km || 
|-id=794 bgcolor=#FA8072
| 510794 ||  || — || January 5, 2013 || Mount Lemmon || Mount Lemmon Survey || H || align=right data-sort-value="0.70" | 700 m || 
|-id=795 bgcolor=#d6d6d6
| 510795 ||  || — || January 30, 2008 || Kitt Peak || Spacewatch ||  || align=right | 1.9 km || 
|-id=796 bgcolor=#d6d6d6
| 510796 ||  || — || February 10, 2008 || Kitt Peak || Spacewatch || EOS || align=right | 1.6 km || 
|-id=797 bgcolor=#d6d6d6
| 510797 ||  || — || September 26, 2011 || Mount Lemmon || Mount Lemmon Survey ||  || align=right | 1.9 km || 
|-id=798 bgcolor=#d6d6d6
| 510798 ||  || — || September 20, 2011 || Haleakala || Pan-STARRS ||  || align=right | 1.8 km || 
|-id=799 bgcolor=#fefefe
| 510799 ||  || — || May 29, 2011 || Mount Lemmon || Mount Lemmon Survey || H || align=right data-sort-value="0.50" | 500 m || 
|-id=800 bgcolor=#fefefe
| 510800 ||  || — || July 28, 2009 || Kitt Peak || Spacewatch || H || align=right data-sort-value="0.62" | 620 m || 
|}

510801–510900 

|-bgcolor=#d6d6d6
| 510801 ||  || — || December 19, 2001 || Kitt Peak || Spacewatch ||  || align=right | 2.7 km || 
|-id=802 bgcolor=#d6d6d6
| 510802 ||  || — || January 15, 2013 || Catalina || CSS ||  || align=right | 4.0 km || 
|-id=803 bgcolor=#d6d6d6
| 510803 ||  || — || August 30, 2011 || Haleakala || Pan-STARRS ||  || align=right | 2.5 km || 
|-id=804 bgcolor=#d6d6d6
| 510804 ||  || — || December 23, 2012 || Haleakala || Pan-STARRS ||  || align=right | 2.1 km || 
|-id=805 bgcolor=#d6d6d6
| 510805 ||  || — || January 16, 2013 || Haleakala || Pan-STARRS || TIR || align=right | 2.9 km || 
|-id=806 bgcolor=#d6d6d6
| 510806 ||  || — || February 13, 2008 || Kitt Peak || Spacewatch ||  || align=right | 1.5 km || 
|-id=807 bgcolor=#fefefe
| 510807 ||  || — || January 18, 2013 || Haleakala || Pan-STARRS || H || align=right data-sort-value="0.43" | 430 m || 
|-id=808 bgcolor=#d6d6d6
| 510808 ||  || — || February 9, 2007 || Catalina || CSS ||  || align=right | 3.9 km || 
|-id=809 bgcolor=#d6d6d6
| 510809 ||  || — || January 16, 2013 || Haleakala || Pan-STARRS ||  || align=right | 2.8 km || 
|-id=810 bgcolor=#d6d6d6
| 510810 ||  || — || October 25, 2011 || Haleakala || Pan-STARRS ||  || align=right | 2.6 km || 
|-id=811 bgcolor=#d6d6d6
| 510811 ||  || — || September 14, 2006 || Kitt Peak || Spacewatch ||  || align=right | 1.8 km || 
|-id=812 bgcolor=#d6d6d6
| 510812 ||  || — || January 6, 2013 || Kitt Peak || Spacewatch ||  || align=right | 3.5 km || 
|-id=813 bgcolor=#d6d6d6
| 510813 ||  || — || October 25, 2011 || Haleakala || Pan-STARRS ||  || align=right | 2.4 km || 
|-id=814 bgcolor=#E9E9E9
| 510814 ||  || — || January 10, 2013 || Haleakala || Pan-STARRS ||  || align=right | 3.2 km || 
|-id=815 bgcolor=#d6d6d6
| 510815 ||  || — || October 23, 2011 || Haleakala || Pan-STARRS ||  || align=right | 2.9 km || 
|-id=816 bgcolor=#d6d6d6
| 510816 ||  || — || October 23, 2011 || Haleakala || Pan-STARRS || EOS || align=right | 2.6 km || 
|-id=817 bgcolor=#fefefe
| 510817 ||  || — || January 10, 2008 || Kitt Peak || Spacewatch || H || align=right data-sort-value="0.58" | 580 m || 
|-id=818 bgcolor=#d6d6d6
| 510818 ||  || — || October 17, 2006 || Mount Lemmon || Mount Lemmon Survey ||  || align=right | 2.5 km || 
|-id=819 bgcolor=#fefefe
| 510819 ||  || — || January 24, 2013 || Haleakala || Pan-STARRS || H || align=right data-sort-value="0.61" | 610 m || 
|-id=820 bgcolor=#fefefe
| 510820 ||  || — || September 25, 2009 || Mount Lemmon || Mount Lemmon Survey || H || align=right data-sort-value="0.59" | 590 m || 
|-id=821 bgcolor=#d6d6d6
| 510821 ||  || — || January 11, 2008 || Kitt Peak || Spacewatch ||  || align=right | 1.8 km || 
|-id=822 bgcolor=#d6d6d6
| 510822 ||  || — || October 26, 2011 || Haleakala || Pan-STARRS || EOS || align=right | 2.4 km || 
|-id=823 bgcolor=#E9E9E9
| 510823 ||  || — || September 23, 2011 || Haleakala || Pan-STARRS ||  || align=right | 2.0 km || 
|-id=824 bgcolor=#d6d6d6
| 510824 ||  || — || January 8, 2002 || Kitt Peak || Spacewatch ||  || align=right | 2.3 km || 
|-id=825 bgcolor=#fefefe
| 510825 ||  || — || January 6, 2013 || Catalina || CSS || H || align=right data-sort-value="0.64" | 640 m || 
|-id=826 bgcolor=#d6d6d6
| 510826 ||  || — || January 10, 2013 || Haleakala || Pan-STARRS ||  || align=right | 2.2 km || 
|-id=827 bgcolor=#d6d6d6
| 510827 ||  || — || January 10, 2013 || Kitt Peak || Spacewatch ||  || align=right | 2.6 km || 
|-id=828 bgcolor=#E9E9E9
| 510828 ||  || — || October 19, 2011 || Mount Lemmon || Mount Lemmon Survey ||  || align=right | 2.0 km || 
|-id=829 bgcolor=#d6d6d6
| 510829 ||  || — || December 1, 2011 || Haleakala || Pan-STARRS ||  || align=right | 3.1 km || 
|-id=830 bgcolor=#d6d6d6
| 510830 ||  || — || March 5, 2008 || Mount Lemmon || Mount Lemmon Survey ||  || align=right | 2.3 km || 
|-id=831 bgcolor=#d6d6d6
| 510831 ||  || — || February 1, 2013 || Kitt Peak || Spacewatch ||  || align=right | 2.6 km || 
|-id=832 bgcolor=#d6d6d6
| 510832 ||  || — || November 16, 2011 || Mount Lemmon || Mount Lemmon Survey || KOR || align=right | 1.2 km || 
|-id=833 bgcolor=#d6d6d6
| 510833 ||  || — || February 10, 2002 || Socorro || LINEAR ||  || align=right | 2.7 km || 
|-id=834 bgcolor=#d6d6d6
| 510834 ||  || — || January 18, 2013 || Mount Lemmon || Mount Lemmon Survey ||  || align=right | 2.7 km || 
|-id=835 bgcolor=#fefefe
| 510835 ||  || — || January 9, 2013 || Mount Lemmon || Mount Lemmon Survey || H || align=right data-sort-value="0.72" | 720 m || 
|-id=836 bgcolor=#d6d6d6
| 510836 ||  || — || December 14, 2001 || Kitt Peak || Spacewatch ||  || align=right | 3.2 km || 
|-id=837 bgcolor=#fefefe
| 510837 ||  || — || February 3, 2013 || Haleakala || Pan-STARRS || H || align=right data-sort-value="0.70" | 700 m || 
|-id=838 bgcolor=#fefefe
| 510838 ||  || — || February 8, 2013 || Haleakala || Pan-STARRS || H || align=right data-sort-value="0.59" | 590 m || 
|-id=839 bgcolor=#d6d6d6
| 510839 ||  || — || January 18, 2013 || Haleakala || Pan-STARRS ||  || align=right | 2.6 km || 
|-id=840 bgcolor=#fefefe
| 510840 ||  || — || February 2, 2013 || Haleakala || Pan-STARRS || H || align=right data-sort-value="0.69" | 690 m || 
|-id=841 bgcolor=#d6d6d6
| 510841 ||  || — || February 5, 2013 || Kitt Peak || Spacewatch ||  || align=right | 2.6 km || 
|-id=842 bgcolor=#d6d6d6
| 510842 ||  || — || March 7, 2008 || Kitt Peak || Spacewatch ||  || align=right | 2.4 km || 
|-id=843 bgcolor=#fefefe
| 510843 ||  || — || January 9, 2013 || Kitt Peak || Spacewatch || H || align=right data-sort-value="0.43" | 430 m || 
|-id=844 bgcolor=#d6d6d6
| 510844 ||  || — || February 13, 2008 || Mount Lemmon || Mount Lemmon Survey ||  || align=right | 2.0 km || 
|-id=845 bgcolor=#d6d6d6
| 510845 ||  || — || December 10, 2006 || Kitt Peak || Spacewatch ||  || align=right | 2.1 km || 
|-id=846 bgcolor=#d6d6d6
| 510846 ||  || — || February 1, 2013 || Mount Lemmon || Mount Lemmon Survey ||  || align=right | 2.9 km || 
|-id=847 bgcolor=#fefefe
| 510847 ||  || — || February 2, 2013 || Mount Lemmon || Mount Lemmon Survey || H || align=right data-sort-value="0.64" | 640 m || 
|-id=848 bgcolor=#d6d6d6
| 510848 ||  || — || January 10, 2013 || Haleakala || Pan-STARRS ||  || align=right | 2.7 km || 
|-id=849 bgcolor=#d6d6d6
| 510849 ||  || — || February 5, 2013 || Mount Lemmon || Mount Lemmon Survey ||  || align=right | 2.7 km || 
|-id=850 bgcolor=#fefefe
| 510850 ||  || — || February 7, 2013 || Kitt Peak || Spacewatch || H || align=right data-sort-value="0.57" | 570 m || 
|-id=851 bgcolor=#E9E9E9
| 510851 ||  || — || September 2, 2010 || Mount Lemmon || Mount Lemmon Survey ||  || align=right | 2.3 km || 
|-id=852 bgcolor=#d6d6d6
| 510852 ||  || — || January 10, 2008 || Kitt Peak || Spacewatch ||  || align=right | 1.7 km || 
|-id=853 bgcolor=#d6d6d6
| 510853 ||  || — || January 23, 2013 || Mount Lemmon || Mount Lemmon Survey ||  || align=right | 2.9 km || 
|-id=854 bgcolor=#d6d6d6
| 510854 ||  || — || January 5, 2013 || Mount Lemmon || Mount Lemmon Survey || THM || align=right | 1.8 km || 
|-id=855 bgcolor=#d6d6d6
| 510855 ||  || — || August 15, 2009 || Kitt Peak || Spacewatch ||  || align=right | 2.9 km || 
|-id=856 bgcolor=#d6d6d6
| 510856 ||  || — || November 28, 2011 || Mount Lemmon || Mount Lemmon Survey ||  || align=right | 2.4 km || 
|-id=857 bgcolor=#d6d6d6
| 510857 ||  || — || January 20, 2013 || Mount Lemmon || Mount Lemmon Survey ||  || align=right | 2.7 km || 
|-id=858 bgcolor=#d6d6d6
| 510858 ||  || — || December 30, 2007 || Kitt Peak || Spacewatch ||  || align=right | 1.9 km || 
|-id=859 bgcolor=#fefefe
| 510859 ||  || — || March 5, 2008 || Kitt Peak || Spacewatch || H || align=right data-sort-value="0.65" | 650 m || 
|-id=860 bgcolor=#d6d6d6
| 510860 ||  || — || March 5, 2008 || Kitt Peak || Spacewatch || THM || align=right | 1.9 km || 
|-id=861 bgcolor=#fefefe
| 510861 ||  || — || August 1, 2011 || Haleakala || Pan-STARRS || H || align=right data-sort-value="0.77" | 770 m || 
|-id=862 bgcolor=#fefefe
| 510862 ||  || — || January 9, 2013 || Mount Lemmon || Mount Lemmon Survey || H || align=right data-sort-value="0.59" | 590 m || 
|-id=863 bgcolor=#E9E9E9
| 510863 ||  || — || February 8, 2013 || Haleakala || Pan-STARRS ||  || align=right | 2.5 km || 
|-id=864 bgcolor=#d6d6d6
| 510864 ||  || — || August 29, 2005 || Kitt Peak || Spacewatch ||  || align=right | 2.6 km || 
|-id=865 bgcolor=#d6d6d6
| 510865 ||  || — || October 23, 2011 || Haleakala || Pan-STARRS || EOS || align=right | 1.8 km || 
|-id=866 bgcolor=#d6d6d6
| 510866 ||  || — || March 28, 2008 || Mount Lemmon || Mount Lemmon Survey || THM || align=right | 1.9 km || 
|-id=867 bgcolor=#d6d6d6
| 510867 ||  || — || September 21, 2011 || Kitt Peak || Spacewatch ||  || align=right | 2.7 km || 
|-id=868 bgcolor=#d6d6d6
| 510868 ||  || — || March 8, 2008 || Kitt Peak || Spacewatch || EOS || align=right | 1.6 km || 
|-id=869 bgcolor=#d6d6d6
| 510869 ||  || — || September 19, 2011 || Haleakala || Pan-STARRS ||  || align=right | 2.4 km || 
|-id=870 bgcolor=#d6d6d6
| 510870 ||  || — || January 20, 2013 || Kitt Peak || Spacewatch || AEG || align=right | 2.7 km || 
|-id=871 bgcolor=#d6d6d6
| 510871 ||  || — || October 23, 2011 || Haleakala || Pan-STARRS ||  || align=right | 2.5 km || 
|-id=872 bgcolor=#d6d6d6
| 510872 ||  || — || January 27, 2007 || Mount Lemmon || Mount Lemmon Survey ||  || align=right | 3.2 km || 
|-id=873 bgcolor=#fefefe
| 510873 ||  || — || August 28, 2011 || Haleakala || Pan-STARRS || H || align=right data-sort-value="0.77" | 770 m || 
|-id=874 bgcolor=#d6d6d6
| 510874 ||  || — || September 20, 2011 || Kitt Peak || Spacewatch ||  || align=right | 3.0 km || 
|-id=875 bgcolor=#d6d6d6
| 510875 ||  || — || March 31, 2008 || Mount Lemmon || Mount Lemmon Survey ||  || align=right | 2.1 km || 
|-id=876 bgcolor=#d6d6d6
| 510876 ||  || — || October 23, 2011 || Haleakala || Pan-STARRS || VER || align=right | 3.4 km || 
|-id=877 bgcolor=#d6d6d6
| 510877 ||  || — || March 29, 2008 || Kitt Peak || Spacewatch || HYG || align=right | 2.5 km || 
|-id=878 bgcolor=#fefefe
| 510878 ||  || — || January 19, 2005 || Kitt Peak || Spacewatch || H || align=right data-sort-value="0.86" | 860 m || 
|-id=879 bgcolor=#fefefe
| 510879 ||  || — || February 1, 2013 || Kitt Peak || Spacewatch || H || align=right data-sort-value="0.67" | 670 m || 
|-id=880 bgcolor=#d6d6d6
| 510880 ||  || — || November 2, 2011 || Kitt Peak || Spacewatch ||  || align=right | 2.5 km || 
|-id=881 bgcolor=#fefefe
| 510881 ||  || — || January 18, 2013 || Haleakala || Pan-STARRS || H || align=right data-sort-value="0.57" | 570 m || 
|-id=882 bgcolor=#fefefe
| 510882 ||  || — || February 7, 2013 || Catalina || CSS || H || align=right data-sort-value="0.50" | 500 m || 
|-id=883 bgcolor=#d6d6d6
| 510883 ||  || — || March 1, 2008 || Kitt Peak || Spacewatch ||  || align=right | 2.1 km || 
|-id=884 bgcolor=#d6d6d6
| 510884 ||  || — || March 8, 2008 || Kitt Peak || Spacewatch ||  || align=right | 2.2 km || 
|-id=885 bgcolor=#d6d6d6
| 510885 ||  || — || March 11, 2003 || Kitt Peak || Spacewatch ||  || align=right | 1.6 km || 
|-id=886 bgcolor=#d6d6d6
| 510886 ||  || — || August 17, 2009 || Kitt Peak || Spacewatch ||  || align=right | 2.9 km || 
|-id=887 bgcolor=#d6d6d6
| 510887 ||  || — || February 5, 2013 || Kitt Peak || Spacewatch ||  || align=right | 2.2 km || 
|-id=888 bgcolor=#d6d6d6
| 510888 ||  || — || August 28, 2011 || Siding Spring || SSS ||  || align=right | 2.4 km || 
|-id=889 bgcolor=#d6d6d6
| 510889 ||  || — || February 14, 2013 || Kitt Peak || Spacewatch ||  || align=right | 2.7 km || 
|-id=890 bgcolor=#d6d6d6
| 510890 ||  || — || February 5, 2013 || Kitt Peak || Spacewatch ||  || align=right | 2.4 km || 
|-id=891 bgcolor=#d6d6d6
| 510891 ||  || — || February 20, 2002 || Kitt Peak || Spacewatch ||  || align=right | 2.5 km || 
|-id=892 bgcolor=#d6d6d6
| 510892 ||  || — || January 9, 2013 || Mount Lemmon || Mount Lemmon Survey || ELF || align=right | 3.2 km || 
|-id=893 bgcolor=#d6d6d6
| 510893 ||  || — || February 15, 2013 || Haleakala || Pan-STARRS ||  || align=right | 2.9 km || 
|-id=894 bgcolor=#d6d6d6
| 510894 ||  || — || October 16, 2006 || Kitt Peak || Spacewatch ||  || align=right | 2.2 km || 
|-id=895 bgcolor=#d6d6d6
| 510895 ||  || — || December 21, 2006 || Kitt Peak || Spacewatch ||  || align=right | 3.0 km || 
|-id=896 bgcolor=#E9E9E9
| 510896 ||  || — || January 10, 2013 || Haleakala || Pan-STARRS || AGN || align=right | 1.2 km || 
|-id=897 bgcolor=#d6d6d6
| 510897 ||  || — || July 14, 2010 || WISE || WISE ||  || align=right | 4.1 km || 
|-id=898 bgcolor=#d6d6d6
| 510898 ||  || — || July 2, 2010 || WISE || WISE ||  || align=right | 3.2 km || 
|-id=899 bgcolor=#fefefe
| 510899 ||  || — || January 22, 2013 || Haleakala || Pan-STARRS || H || align=right data-sort-value="0.55" | 550 m || 
|-id=900 bgcolor=#d6d6d6
| 510900 ||  || — || October 25, 2011 || Haleakala || Pan-STARRS ||  || align=right | 2.8 km || 
|}

510901–511000 

|-bgcolor=#d6d6d6
| 510901 ||  || — || March 11, 2008 || Kitt Peak || Spacewatch ||  || align=right | 1.9 km || 
|-id=902 bgcolor=#d6d6d6
| 510902 ||  || — || February 8, 2002 || Kitt Peak || Spacewatch || TIR || align=right | 1.9 km || 
|-id=903 bgcolor=#d6d6d6
| 510903 ||  || — || July 1, 2011 || Haleakala || Pan-STARRS ||  || align=right | 2.8 km || 
|-id=904 bgcolor=#C2FFFF
| 510904 ||  || — || August 24, 2008 || Kitt Peak || Spacewatch || L4 || align=right | 9.8 km || 
|-id=905 bgcolor=#d6d6d6
| 510905 ||  || — || September 29, 2005 || Mount Lemmon || Mount Lemmon Survey ||  || align=right | 2.1 km || 
|-id=906 bgcolor=#fefefe
| 510906 ||  || — || January 27, 2000 || Kitt Peak || Spacewatch || H || align=right data-sort-value="0.71" | 710 m || 
|-id=907 bgcolor=#d6d6d6
| 510907 ||  || — || October 23, 2011 || Haleakala || Pan-STARRS ||  || align=right | 3.7 km || 
|-id=908 bgcolor=#d6d6d6
| 510908 ||  || — || April 8, 2002 || Kitt Peak || Spacewatch || LIX || align=right | 2.5 km || 
|-id=909 bgcolor=#d6d6d6
| 510909 ||  || — || February 17, 2013 || Kitt Peak || Spacewatch ||  || align=right | 2.6 km || 
|-id=910 bgcolor=#fefefe
| 510910 ||  || — || December 20, 2012 || Mount Lemmon || Mount Lemmon Survey || H || align=right data-sort-value="0.73" | 730 m || 
|-id=911 bgcolor=#d6d6d6
| 510911 ||  || — || March 3, 1997 || Kitt Peak || Spacewatch ||  || align=right | 3.6 km || 
|-id=912 bgcolor=#fefefe
| 510912 ||  || — || February 5, 2013 || Haleakala || Pan-STARRS || H || align=right data-sort-value="0.70" | 700 m || 
|-id=913 bgcolor=#d6d6d6
| 510913 ||  || — || March 10, 2008 || Mount Lemmon || Mount Lemmon Survey || EOS || align=right | 1.6 km || 
|-id=914 bgcolor=#d6d6d6
| 510914 ||  || — || February 13, 2008 || Mount Lemmon || Mount Lemmon Survey ||  || align=right | 2.4 km || 
|-id=915 bgcolor=#d6d6d6
| 510915 ||  || — || November 18, 2007 || Mount Lemmon || Mount Lemmon Survey ||  || align=right | 2.1 km || 
|-id=916 bgcolor=#d6d6d6
| 510916 ||  || — || April 30, 2008 || Kitt Peak || Spacewatch ||  || align=right | 1.9 km || 
|-id=917 bgcolor=#d6d6d6
| 510917 ||  || — || January 19, 2013 || Mount Lemmon || Mount Lemmon Survey ||  || align=right | 2.6 km || 
|-id=918 bgcolor=#FA8072
| 510918 ||  || — || March 6, 2013 || Haleakala || Pan-STARRS || H || align=right data-sort-value="0.63" | 630 m || 
|-id=919 bgcolor=#d6d6d6
| 510919 ||  || — || October 26, 2011 || Haleakala || Pan-STARRS ||  || align=right | 2.1 km || 
|-id=920 bgcolor=#d6d6d6
| 510920 ||  || — || March 3, 2013 || Kitt Peak || Spacewatch ||  || align=right | 2.5 km || 
|-id=921 bgcolor=#d6d6d6
| 510921 ||  || — || October 24, 2011 || Haleakala || Pan-STARRS ||  || align=right | 1.9 km || 
|-id=922 bgcolor=#d6d6d6
| 510922 ||  || — || February 14, 2013 || Kitt Peak || Spacewatch ||  || align=right | 3.9 km || 
|-id=923 bgcolor=#d6d6d6
| 510923 ||  || — || February 25, 2007 || Mount Lemmon || Mount Lemmon Survey ||  || align=right | 3.0 km || 
|-id=924 bgcolor=#d6d6d6
| 510924 ||  || — || October 23, 2011 || Haleakala || Pan-STARRS ||  || align=right | 3.1 km || 
|-id=925 bgcolor=#d6d6d6
| 510925 ||  || — || January 20, 2013 || Mount Lemmon || Mount Lemmon Survey ||  || align=right | 2.3 km || 
|-id=926 bgcolor=#fefefe
| 510926 ||  || — || February 9, 2005 || Mount Lemmon || Mount Lemmon Survey || H || align=right data-sort-value="0.77" | 770 m || 
|-id=927 bgcolor=#d6d6d6
| 510927 ||  || — || February 2, 2013 || Kitt Peak || Spacewatch ||  || align=right | 2.5 km || 
|-id=928 bgcolor=#d6d6d6
| 510928 ||  || — || February 17, 2013 || Kitt Peak || Spacewatch ||  || align=right | 2.5 km || 
|-id=929 bgcolor=#d6d6d6
| 510929 ||  || — || March 2, 2013 || Kitt Peak || Spacewatch || 3:2 || align=right | 4.1 km || 
|-id=930 bgcolor=#d6d6d6
| 510930 ||  || — || September 10, 2010 || Mount Lemmon || Mount Lemmon Survey ||  || align=right | 2.6 km || 
|-id=931 bgcolor=#d6d6d6
| 510931 ||  || — || August 28, 2005 || Kitt Peak || Spacewatch ||  || align=right | 2.9 km || 
|-id=932 bgcolor=#fefefe
| 510932 ||  || — || January 15, 2005 || Catalina || CSS || H || align=right data-sort-value="0.72" | 720 m || 
|-id=933 bgcolor=#d6d6d6
| 510933 ||  || — || May 31, 2008 || Kitt Peak || Spacewatch ||  || align=right | 2.1 km || 
|-id=934 bgcolor=#d6d6d6
| 510934 ||  || — || December 1, 2006 || Kitt Peak || Spacewatch ||  || align=right | 3.5 km || 
|-id=935 bgcolor=#fefefe
| 510935 ||  || — || March 5, 2008 || Kitt Peak || Spacewatch || H || align=right data-sort-value="0.67" | 670 m || 
|-id=936 bgcolor=#fefefe
| 510936 ||  || — || August 23, 2011 || Haleakala || Pan-STARRS || H || align=right data-sort-value="0.69" | 690 m || 
|-id=937 bgcolor=#d6d6d6
| 510937 ||  || — || October 17, 2010 || Mount Lemmon || Mount Lemmon Survey || VER || align=right | 2.5 km || 
|-id=938 bgcolor=#d6d6d6
| 510938 ||  || — || March 3, 2008 || Mount Lemmon || Mount Lemmon Survey ||  || align=right | 3.5 km || 
|-id=939 bgcolor=#d6d6d6
| 510939 ||  || — || April 6, 2008 || Mount Lemmon || Mount Lemmon Survey ||  || align=right | 3.4 km || 
|-id=940 bgcolor=#d6d6d6
| 510940 ||  || — || January 15, 1996 || Kitt Peak || Spacewatch || HYG || align=right | 2.6 km || 
|-id=941 bgcolor=#d6d6d6
| 510941 ||  || — || August 27, 2009 || La Sagra || OAM Obs. ||  || align=right | 4.0 km || 
|-id=942 bgcolor=#fefefe
| 510942 ||  || — || September 2, 2011 || Haleakala || Pan-STARRS || H || align=right data-sort-value="0.62" | 620 m || 
|-id=943 bgcolor=#FA8072
| 510943 ||  || — || March 4, 2013 || Haleakala || Pan-STARRS || H || align=right data-sort-value="0.60" | 600 m || 
|-id=944 bgcolor=#d6d6d6
| 510944 ||  || — || January 10, 2007 || Kitt Peak || Spacewatch ||  || align=right | 2.5 km || 
|-id=945 bgcolor=#d6d6d6
| 510945 ||  || — || March 13, 2013 || Kitt Peak || Spacewatch || LIX || align=right | 2.8 km || 
|-id=946 bgcolor=#d6d6d6
| 510946 ||  || — || March 15, 2013 || Mount Lemmon || Mount Lemmon Survey ||  || align=right | 2.2 km || 
|-id=947 bgcolor=#d6d6d6
| 510947 ||  || — || January 28, 2007 || Mount Lemmon || Mount Lemmon Survey ||  || align=right | 2.0 km || 
|-id=948 bgcolor=#d6d6d6
| 510948 ||  || — || March 10, 2008 || Kitt Peak || Spacewatch ||  || align=right | 2.4 km || 
|-id=949 bgcolor=#d6d6d6
| 510949 ||  || — || October 1, 2005 || Mount Lemmon || Mount Lemmon Survey ||  || align=right | 2.2 km || 
|-id=950 bgcolor=#d6d6d6
| 510950 ||  || — || March 14, 2013 || Catalina || CSS ||  || align=right | 3.4 km || 
|-id=951 bgcolor=#d6d6d6
| 510951 ||  || — || January 19, 2008 || Mount Lemmon || Mount Lemmon Survey ||  || align=right | 3.1 km || 
|-id=952 bgcolor=#d6d6d6
| 510952 ||  || — || March 7, 2013 || Kitt Peak || Spacewatch ||  || align=right | 2.9 km || 
|-id=953 bgcolor=#d6d6d6
| 510953 ||  || — || December 8, 2005 || Kitt Peak || Spacewatch ||  || align=right | 2.5 km || 
|-id=954 bgcolor=#d6d6d6
| 510954 ||  || — || March 13, 2013 || Mount Lemmon || Mount Lemmon Survey ||  || align=right | 2.2 km || 
|-id=955 bgcolor=#d6d6d6
| 510955 ||  || — || March 17, 2013 || Kitt Peak || Spacewatch ||  || align=right | 2.4 km || 
|-id=956 bgcolor=#d6d6d6
| 510956 ||  || — || March 12, 2013 || Kitt Peak || Spacewatch ||  || align=right | 3.0 km || 
|-id=957 bgcolor=#d6d6d6
| 510957 ||  || — || October 30, 2006 || Mount Lemmon || Mount Lemmon Survey || Tj (2.98) || align=right | 3.2 km || 
|-id=958 bgcolor=#d6d6d6
| 510958 ||  || — || March 5, 2013 || Haleakala || Pan-STARRS ||  || align=right | 2.9 km || 
|-id=959 bgcolor=#d6d6d6
| 510959 ||  || — || September 24, 2005 || Kitt Peak || Spacewatch ||  || align=right | 2.6 km || 
|-id=960 bgcolor=#fefefe
| 510960 ||  || — || October 22, 2006 || Catalina || CSS || H || align=right data-sort-value="0.76" | 760 m || 
|-id=961 bgcolor=#d6d6d6
| 510961 ||  || — || March 11, 2013 || Mount Lemmon || Mount Lemmon Survey ||  || align=right | 2.9 km || 
|-id=962 bgcolor=#fefefe
| 510962 ||  || — || March 18, 2013 || Kitt Peak || Spacewatch || H || align=right data-sort-value="0.66" | 660 m || 
|-id=963 bgcolor=#d6d6d6
| 510963 ||  || — || February 17, 2007 || Kitt Peak || Spacewatch ||  || align=right | 2.8 km || 
|-id=964 bgcolor=#d6d6d6
| 510964 ||  || — || March 5, 2013 || Mount Lemmon || Mount Lemmon Survey ||  || align=right | 2.4 km || 
|-id=965 bgcolor=#d6d6d6
| 510965 ||  || — || February 25, 2007 || Anderson Mesa || LONEOS ||  || align=right | 2.9 km || 
|-id=966 bgcolor=#fefefe
| 510966 ||  || — || November 18, 2001 || Socorro || LINEAR || H || align=right data-sort-value="0.71" | 710 m || 
|-id=967 bgcolor=#FA8072
| 510967 ||  || — || March 7, 2013 || Catalina || CSS || H || align=right data-sort-value="0.68" | 680 m || 
|-id=968 bgcolor=#fefefe
| 510968 ||  || — || November 16, 2006 || Kitt Peak || Spacewatch || H || align=right data-sort-value="0.59" | 590 m || 
|-id=969 bgcolor=#d6d6d6
| 510969 ||  || — || March 16, 2013 || Kitt Peak || Spacewatch ||  || align=right | 2.4 km || 
|-id=970 bgcolor=#d6d6d6
| 510970 ||  || — || March 14, 2013 || Kitt Peak || Spacewatch ||  || align=right | 2.5 km || 
|-id=971 bgcolor=#d6d6d6
| 510971 ||  || — || April 18, 2002 || Kitt Peak || Spacewatch ||  || align=right | 3.0 km || 
|-id=972 bgcolor=#d6d6d6
| 510972 ||  || — || October 26, 2011 || Haleakala || Pan-STARRS ||  || align=right | 2.2 km || 
|-id=973 bgcolor=#d6d6d6
| 510973 ||  || — || March 19, 2013 || Haleakala || Pan-STARRS ||  || align=right | 2.8 km || 
|-id=974 bgcolor=#d6d6d6
| 510974 ||  || — || January 17, 2007 || Kitt Peak || Spacewatch ||  || align=right | 2.3 km || 
|-id=975 bgcolor=#fefefe
| 510975 ||  || — || April 13, 2013 || Haleakala || Pan-STARRS || H || align=right data-sort-value="0.62" | 620 m || 
|-id=976 bgcolor=#fefefe
| 510976 ||  || — || November 11, 2006 || Kitt Peak || Spacewatch || H || align=right data-sort-value="0.40" | 400 m || 
|-id=977 bgcolor=#fefefe
| 510977 ||  || — || October 17, 2006 || Catalina || CSS || H || align=right data-sort-value="0.63" | 630 m || 
|-id=978 bgcolor=#d6d6d6
| 510978 ||  || — || October 31, 2005 || Mount Lemmon || Mount Lemmon Survey ||  || align=right | 3.5 km || 
|-id=979 bgcolor=#d6d6d6
| 510979 ||  || — || February 13, 2012 || Haleakala || Pan-STARRS ||  || align=right | 4.1 km || 
|-id=980 bgcolor=#d6d6d6
| 510980 ||  || — || October 26, 2011 || Haleakala || Pan-STARRS ||  || align=right | 4.1 km || 
|-id=981 bgcolor=#d6d6d6
| 510981 ||  || — || December 21, 2006 || Mount Lemmon || Mount Lemmon Survey ||  || align=right | 3.0 km || 
|-id=982 bgcolor=#d6d6d6
| 510982 ||  || — || March 11, 2013 || Mount Lemmon || Mount Lemmon Survey ||  || align=right | 3.5 km || 
|-id=983 bgcolor=#fefefe
| 510983 ||  || — || May 11, 2005 || Catalina || CSS || H || align=right data-sort-value="0.62" | 620 m || 
|-id=984 bgcolor=#fefefe
| 510984 ||  || — || March 8, 2005 || Catalina || CSS || H || align=right data-sort-value="0.82" | 820 m || 
|-id=985 bgcolor=#d6d6d6
| 510985 ||  || — || September 18, 2010 || Mount Lemmon || Mount Lemmon Survey ||  || align=right | 2.6 km || 
|-id=986 bgcolor=#d6d6d6
| 510986 ||  || — || April 20, 2007 || Mount Lemmon || Mount Lemmon Survey ||  || align=right | 2.7 km || 
|-id=987 bgcolor=#d6d6d6
| 510987 ||  || — || February 17, 2007 || Catalina || CSS ||  || align=right | 2.5 km || 
|-id=988 bgcolor=#d6d6d6
| 510988 ||  || — || April 9, 2013 || Haleakala || Pan-STARRS ||  || align=right | 2.6 km || 
|-id=989 bgcolor=#d6d6d6
| 510989 ||  || — || March 4, 2013 || Haleakala || Pan-STARRS ||  || align=right | 2.8 km || 
|-id=990 bgcolor=#d6d6d6
| 510990 ||  || — || March 31, 2013 || Mount Lemmon || Mount Lemmon Survey ||  || align=right | 2.9 km || 
|-id=991 bgcolor=#d6d6d6
| 510991 ||  || — || January 24, 2012 || La Sagra || OAM Obs. ||  || align=right | 4.2 km || 
|-id=992 bgcolor=#FA8072
| 510992 ||  || — || May 2, 2010 || WISE || WISE || H || align=right data-sort-value="0.71" | 710 m || 
|-id=993 bgcolor=#d6d6d6
| 510993 ||  || — || February 3, 2012 || Mount Lemmon || Mount Lemmon Survey ||  || align=right | 3.2 km || 
|-id=994 bgcolor=#fefefe
| 510994 ||  || — || April 10, 2013 || Mount Lemmon || Mount Lemmon Survey || H || align=right data-sort-value="0.52" | 520 m || 
|-id=995 bgcolor=#d6d6d6
| 510995 ||  || — || November 8, 2010 || Mount Lemmon || Mount Lemmon Survey ||  || align=right | 2.7 km || 
|-id=996 bgcolor=#FA8072
| 510996 ||  || — || May 16, 2013 || Haleakala || Pan-STARRS ||  || align=right data-sort-value="0.51" | 510 m || 
|-id=997 bgcolor=#d6d6d6
| 510997 ||  || — || February 3, 2012 || Haleakala || Pan-STARRS ||  || align=right | 3.2 km || 
|-id=998 bgcolor=#fefefe
| 510998 ||  || — || December 19, 2009 || Mount Lemmon || Mount Lemmon Survey || H || align=right data-sort-value="0.61" | 610 m || 
|-id=999 bgcolor=#fefefe
| 510999 ||  || — || June 10, 2013 || Kitt Peak || Spacewatch || H || align=right data-sort-value="0.72" | 720 m || 
|-id=000 bgcolor=#fefefe
| 511000 ||  || — || June 10, 2013 || Kitt Peak || Spacewatch || H || align=right data-sort-value="0.67" | 670 m || 
|}

References

External links 
 Discovery Circumstances: Numbered Minor Planets (510001)–(515000) (IAU Minor Planet Center)

0510